

226001–226100 

|-bgcolor=#E9E9E9
| 226001 ||  || — || February 20, 2002 || Palomar || NEAT || — || align=right | 1.9 km || 
|-id=002 bgcolor=#E9E9E9
| 226002 ||  || — || February 21, 2002 || Palomar || NEAT || — || align=right | 4.4 km || 
|-id=003 bgcolor=#E9E9E9
| 226003 ||  || — || February 21, 2002 || Kitt Peak || Spacewatch || — || align=right | 2.5 km || 
|-id=004 bgcolor=#E9E9E9
| 226004 || 2002 EB || — || March 3, 2002 || Socorro || LINEAR || BRU || align=right | 4.5 km || 
|-id=005 bgcolor=#C2FFFF
| 226005 ||  || — || March 6, 2002 || Palomar || NEAT || L4 || align=right | 12 km || 
|-id=006 bgcolor=#E9E9E9
| 226006 ||  || — || March 9, 2002 || Kitt Peak || Spacewatch || HOF || align=right | 2.6 km || 
|-id=007 bgcolor=#E9E9E9
| 226007 ||  || — || March 9, 2002 || Palomar || NEAT || ADE || align=right | 3.9 km || 
|-id=008 bgcolor=#E9E9E9
| 226008 ||  || — || March 10, 2002 || Haleakala || NEAT || — || align=right | 3.1 km || 
|-id=009 bgcolor=#E9E9E9
| 226009 ||  || — || March 11, 2002 || Palomar || NEAT || AGN || align=right | 1.9 km || 
|-id=010 bgcolor=#E9E9E9
| 226010 ||  || — || March 12, 2002 || Palomar || NEAT || — || align=right | 3.3 km || 
|-id=011 bgcolor=#E9E9E9
| 226011 ||  || — || March 9, 2002 || Socorro || LINEAR || — || align=right | 2.0 km || 
|-id=012 bgcolor=#E9E9E9
| 226012 ||  || — || March 13, 2002 || Socorro || LINEAR || GEF || align=right | 4.1 km || 
|-id=013 bgcolor=#d6d6d6
| 226013 ||  || — || March 13, 2002 || Socorro || LINEAR || — || align=right | 3.8 km || 
|-id=014 bgcolor=#E9E9E9
| 226014 ||  || — || March 12, 2002 || Palomar || NEAT || — || align=right | 4.3 km || 
|-id=015 bgcolor=#E9E9E9
| 226015 ||  || — || March 9, 2002 || Socorro || LINEAR || — || align=right | 2.6 km || 
|-id=016 bgcolor=#d6d6d6
| 226016 ||  || — || March 9, 2002 || Socorro || LINEAR || KOR || align=right | 2.5 km || 
|-id=017 bgcolor=#E9E9E9
| 226017 ||  || — || March 14, 2002 || Socorro || LINEAR || NEM || align=right | 2.6 km || 
|-id=018 bgcolor=#E9E9E9
| 226018 ||  || — || March 6, 2002 || Palomar || NEAT || — || align=right | 3.7 km || 
|-id=019 bgcolor=#E9E9E9
| 226019 ||  || — || March 9, 2002 || Anderson Mesa || LONEOS || — || align=right | 1.8 km || 
|-id=020 bgcolor=#E9E9E9
| 226020 ||  || — || March 9, 2002 || Catalina || CSS || — || align=right | 3.4 km || 
|-id=021 bgcolor=#d6d6d6
| 226021 ||  || — || March 9, 2002 || Kitt Peak || Spacewatch || CHA || align=right | 2.5 km || 
|-id=022 bgcolor=#C2FFFF
| 226022 ||  || — || March 10, 2002 || Kitt Peak || Spacewatch || L4 || align=right | 10 km || 
|-id=023 bgcolor=#E9E9E9
| 226023 ||  || — || March 10, 2002 || Haleakala || NEAT || INO || align=right | 2.1 km || 
|-id=024 bgcolor=#E9E9E9
| 226024 ||  || — || March 12, 2002 || Anderson Mesa || LONEOS || NEM || align=right | 2.9 km || 
|-id=025 bgcolor=#E9E9E9
| 226025 ||  || — || March 12, 2002 || Palomar || NEAT || PAD || align=right | 2.5 km || 
|-id=026 bgcolor=#d6d6d6
| 226026 ||  || — || March 12, 2002 || Palomar || NEAT || — || align=right | 4.4 km || 
|-id=027 bgcolor=#C2FFFF
| 226027 ||  || — || March 12, 2002 || Kitt Peak || Spacewatch || L4006 || align=right | 13 km || 
|-id=028 bgcolor=#E9E9E9
| 226028 ||  || — || March 12, 2002 || Palomar || NEAT || — || align=right | 2.0 km || 
|-id=029 bgcolor=#E9E9E9
| 226029 ||  || — || March 12, 2002 || Palomar || NEAT || — || align=right | 2.9 km || 
|-id=030 bgcolor=#C2FFFF
| 226030 ||  || — || March 12, 2002 || Nyukasa || Mount Nyukasa Stn. || L4 || align=right | 11 km || 
|-id=031 bgcolor=#E9E9E9
| 226031 ||  || — || March 16, 2002 || Socorro || LINEAR || JUN || align=right | 1.4 km || 
|-id=032 bgcolor=#E9E9E9
| 226032 ||  || — || March 16, 2002 || Haleakala || NEAT || — || align=right | 1.9 km || 
|-id=033 bgcolor=#C2FFFF
| 226033 ||  || — || March 18, 2002 || Kitt Peak || M. W. Buie || L4 || align=right | 10 km || 
|-id=034 bgcolor=#E9E9E9
| 226034 ||  || — || March 20, 2002 || Socorro || LINEAR || — || align=right | 1.8 km || 
|-id=035 bgcolor=#E9E9E9
| 226035 ||  || — || March 20, 2002 || Socorro || LINEAR || — || align=right | 2.9 km || 
|-id=036 bgcolor=#C2FFFF
| 226036 ||  || — || March 20, 2002 || Anderson Mesa || LONEOS || L4 || align=right | 12 km || 
|-id=037 bgcolor=#E9E9E9
| 226037 ||  || — || March 21, 2002 || Socorro || LINEAR || JUN || align=right | 4.5 km || 
|-id=038 bgcolor=#E9E9E9
| 226038 ||  || — || March 30, 2002 || Palomar || NEAT || — || align=right | 1.9 km || 
|-id=039 bgcolor=#E9E9E9
| 226039 ||  || — || April 14, 2002 || Socorro || LINEAR || PAL || align=right | 4.7 km || 
|-id=040 bgcolor=#d6d6d6
| 226040 ||  || — || April 13, 2002 || Kitt Peak || Spacewatch || BRA || align=right | 2.3 km || 
|-id=041 bgcolor=#fefefe
| 226041 ||  || — || April 2, 2002 || Socorro || LINEAR || H || align=right | 1.0 km || 
|-id=042 bgcolor=#E9E9E9
| 226042 ||  || — || April 4, 2002 || Palomar || NEAT || — || align=right | 2.2 km || 
|-id=043 bgcolor=#fefefe
| 226043 ||  || — || April 8, 2002 || Kitt Peak || Spacewatch || H || align=right data-sort-value="0.96" | 960 m || 
|-id=044 bgcolor=#d6d6d6
| 226044 ||  || — || April 8, 2002 || Palomar || NEAT || KOR || align=right | 2.7 km || 
|-id=045 bgcolor=#E9E9E9
| 226045 ||  || — || April 9, 2002 || Anderson Mesa || LONEOS || INO || align=right | 1.9 km || 
|-id=046 bgcolor=#FA8072
| 226046 ||  || — || April 9, 2002 || Socorro || LINEAR || — || align=right data-sort-value="0.79" | 790 m || 
|-id=047 bgcolor=#E9E9E9
| 226047 ||  || — || April 10, 2002 || Socorro || LINEAR || AGN || align=right | 2.0 km || 
|-id=048 bgcolor=#E9E9E9
| 226048 ||  || — || April 10, 2002 || Socorro || LINEAR || — || align=right | 3.3 km || 
|-id=049 bgcolor=#d6d6d6
| 226049 ||  || — || April 10, 2002 || Socorro || LINEAR || — || align=right | 4.8 km || 
|-id=050 bgcolor=#d6d6d6
| 226050 ||  || — || April 10, 2002 || Socorro || LINEAR || — || align=right | 3.0 km || 
|-id=051 bgcolor=#d6d6d6
| 226051 ||  || — || April 11, 2002 || Anderson Mesa || LONEOS || — || align=right | 6.2 km || 
|-id=052 bgcolor=#d6d6d6
| 226052 ||  || — || April 11, 2002 || Socorro || LINEAR || FIR || align=right | 5.9 km || 
|-id=053 bgcolor=#C2FFFF
| 226053 ||  || — || April 12, 2002 || Palomar || NEAT || L4 || align=right | 14 km || 
|-id=054 bgcolor=#d6d6d6
| 226054 ||  || — || April 12, 2002 || Socorro || LINEAR || — || align=right | 5.5 km || 
|-id=055 bgcolor=#E9E9E9
| 226055 ||  || — || April 12, 2002 || Socorro || LINEAR || AGN || align=right | 1.7 km || 
|-id=056 bgcolor=#d6d6d6
| 226056 ||  || — || April 12, 2002 || Socorro || LINEAR || EUP || align=right | 5.9 km || 
|-id=057 bgcolor=#E9E9E9
| 226057 ||  || — || April 12, 2002 || Kitt Peak || Spacewatch || GEF || align=right | 2.0 km || 
|-id=058 bgcolor=#d6d6d6
| 226058 ||  || — || April 12, 2002 || Kitt Peak || Spacewatch || — || align=right | 3.5 km || 
|-id=059 bgcolor=#E9E9E9
| 226059 ||  || — || April 14, 2002 || Socorro || LINEAR || AGN || align=right | 1.6 km || 
|-id=060 bgcolor=#E9E9E9
| 226060 ||  || — || April 15, 2002 || Palomar || NEAT || — || align=right | 2.6 km || 
|-id=061 bgcolor=#E9E9E9
| 226061 ||  || — || April 14, 2002 || Palomar || NEAT || — || align=right | 2.6 km || 
|-id=062 bgcolor=#E9E9E9
| 226062 ||  || — || April 9, 2002 || Socorro || LINEAR || MRX || align=right | 1.7 km || 
|-id=063 bgcolor=#E9E9E9
| 226063 ||  || — || April 10, 2002 || Socorro || LINEAR || — || align=right | 2.8 km || 
|-id=064 bgcolor=#d6d6d6
| 226064 ||  || — || April 13, 2002 || Kitt Peak || Spacewatch || — || align=right | 3.5 km || 
|-id=065 bgcolor=#E9E9E9
| 226065 ||  || — || April 16, 2002 || Socorro || LINEAR || — || align=right | 3.7 km || 
|-id=066 bgcolor=#d6d6d6
| 226066 ||  || — || April 16, 2002 || Socorro || LINEAR || — || align=right | 4.0 km || 
|-id=067 bgcolor=#C2FFFF
| 226067 ||  || — || April 17, 2002 || Kitt Peak || Spacewatch || L4ERY || align=right | 14 km || 
|-id=068 bgcolor=#d6d6d6
| 226068 ||  || — || May 7, 2002 || Palomar || NEAT || EOS || align=right | 2.7 km || 
|-id=069 bgcolor=#d6d6d6
| 226069 ||  || — || May 8, 2002 || Socorro || LINEAR || — || align=right | 4.3 km || 
|-id=070 bgcolor=#E9E9E9
| 226070 ||  || — || May 6, 2002 || Socorro || LINEAR || ADE || align=right | 4.9 km || 
|-id=071 bgcolor=#d6d6d6
| 226071 ||  || — || May 11, 2002 || Socorro || LINEAR || — || align=right | 3.8 km || 
|-id=072 bgcolor=#d6d6d6
| 226072 ||  || — || May 9, 2002 || Socorro || LINEAR || — || align=right | 6.1 km || 
|-id=073 bgcolor=#E9E9E9
| 226073 ||  || — || May 9, 2002 || Socorro || LINEAR || — || align=right | 4.5 km || 
|-id=074 bgcolor=#E9E9E9
| 226074 ||  || — || May 14, 2002 || Palomar || NEAT || — || align=right | 2.9 km || 
|-id=075 bgcolor=#d6d6d6
| 226075 ||  || — || May 7, 2002 || Palomar || NEAT || EOS || align=right | 2.8 km || 
|-id=076 bgcolor=#d6d6d6
| 226076 ||  || — || May 9, 2002 || Palomar || NEAT || EOS || align=right | 2.7 km || 
|-id=077 bgcolor=#fefefe
| 226077 ||  || — || May 9, 2002 || Palomar || NEAT || — || align=right data-sort-value="0.70" | 700 m || 
|-id=078 bgcolor=#d6d6d6
| 226078 ||  || — || May 25, 2002 || Palomar || NEAT || — || align=right | 5.7 km || 
|-id=079 bgcolor=#d6d6d6
| 226079 || 2002 LO || — || June 2, 2002 || Palomar || NEAT || EUP || align=right | 5.6 km || 
|-id=080 bgcolor=#d6d6d6
| 226080 ||  || — || June 6, 2002 || Socorro || LINEAR || EOS || align=right | 4.0 km || 
|-id=081 bgcolor=#d6d6d6
| 226081 ||  || — || June 6, 2002 || Socorro || LINEAR || TIR || align=right | 4.9 km || 
|-id=082 bgcolor=#FA8072
| 226082 ||  || — || June 6, 2002 || Socorro || LINEAR || — || align=right | 1.1 km || 
|-id=083 bgcolor=#d6d6d6
| 226083 ||  || — || June 8, 2002 || Socorro || LINEAR || EUP || align=right | 8.0 km || 
|-id=084 bgcolor=#d6d6d6
| 226084 ||  || — || June 9, 2002 || Socorro || LINEAR || — || align=right | 4.8 km || 
|-id=085 bgcolor=#d6d6d6
| 226085 ||  || — || June 9, 2002 || Socorro || LINEAR || — || align=right | 3.9 km || 
|-id=086 bgcolor=#d6d6d6
| 226086 ||  || — || June 9, 2002 || Palomar || NEAT || — || align=right | 4.6 km || 
|-id=087 bgcolor=#FA8072
| 226087 ||  || — || July 9, 2002 || Socorro || LINEAR || — || align=right | 1.1 km || 
|-id=088 bgcolor=#fefefe
| 226088 ||  || — || July 13, 2002 || Palomar || NEAT || — || align=right | 1.2 km || 
|-id=089 bgcolor=#fefefe
| 226089 ||  || — || July 14, 2002 || Palomar || S. F. Hönig || — || align=right | 1.1 km || 
|-id=090 bgcolor=#d6d6d6
| 226090 ||  || — || July 12, 2002 || Palomar || NEAT || — || align=right | 3.7 km || 
|-id=091 bgcolor=#d6d6d6
| 226091 ||  || — || July 20, 2002 || Palomar || NEAT || — || align=right | 5.6 km || 
|-id=092 bgcolor=#fefefe
| 226092 ||  || — || July 21, 2002 || Palomar || NEAT || — || align=right | 1.1 km || 
|-id=093 bgcolor=#d6d6d6
| 226093 ||  || — || July 18, 2002 || Socorro || LINEAR || — || align=right | 5.5 km || 
|-id=094 bgcolor=#d6d6d6
| 226094 ||  || — || July 18, 2002 || Socorro || LINEAR || — || align=right | 5.3 km || 
|-id=095 bgcolor=#d6d6d6
| 226095 ||  || — || July 18, 2002 || Socorro || LINEAR || — || align=right | 5.1 km || 
|-id=096 bgcolor=#fefefe
| 226096 ||  || — || July 18, 2002 || Socorro || LINEAR || — || align=right | 1.0 km || 
|-id=097 bgcolor=#d6d6d6
| 226097 ||  || — || July 29, 2002 || Palomar || NEAT || VER || align=right | 4.1 km || 
|-id=098 bgcolor=#d6d6d6
| 226098 ||  || — || August 4, 2002 || Palomar || NEAT || VER || align=right | 4.8 km || 
|-id=099 bgcolor=#fefefe
| 226099 ||  || — || August 6, 2002 || Palomar || NEAT || FLO || align=right | 2.3 km || 
|-id=100 bgcolor=#d6d6d6
| 226100 ||  || — || August 6, 2002 || Palomar || NEAT || — || align=right | 3.5 km || 
|}

226101–226200 

|-bgcolor=#fefefe
| 226101 ||  || — || August 6, 2002 || Palomar || NEAT || — || align=right | 2.4 km || 
|-id=102 bgcolor=#fefefe
| 226102 ||  || — || August 6, 2002 || Palomar || NEAT || — || align=right data-sort-value="0.98" | 980 m || 
|-id=103 bgcolor=#fefefe
| 226103 ||  || — || August 10, 2002 || Socorro || LINEAR || — || align=right | 1.00 km || 
|-id=104 bgcolor=#fefefe
| 226104 ||  || — || August 9, 2002 || Socorro || LINEAR || FLO || align=right | 2.0 km || 
|-id=105 bgcolor=#fefefe
| 226105 ||  || — || August 6, 2002 || Palomar || NEAT || — || align=right data-sort-value="0.93" | 930 m || 
|-id=106 bgcolor=#fefefe
| 226106 ||  || — || August 11, 2002 || Palomar || NEAT || FLO || align=right data-sort-value="0.84" | 840 m || 
|-id=107 bgcolor=#fefefe
| 226107 ||  || — || August 13, 2002 || Socorro || LINEAR || FLO || align=right data-sort-value="0.99" | 990 m || 
|-id=108 bgcolor=#fefefe
| 226108 ||  || — || August 14, 2002 || Socorro || LINEAR || — || align=right | 1.3 km || 
|-id=109 bgcolor=#fefefe
| 226109 ||  || — || August 14, 2002 || Socorro || LINEAR || — || align=right | 1.2 km || 
|-id=110 bgcolor=#d6d6d6
| 226110 ||  || — || August 13, 2002 || Palomar || NEAT || — || align=right | 5.8 km || 
|-id=111 bgcolor=#d6d6d6
| 226111 ||  || — || August 13, 2002 || Anderson Mesa || LONEOS || — || align=right | 5.8 km || 
|-id=112 bgcolor=#fefefe
| 226112 ||  || — || August 14, 2002 || Socorro || LINEAR || — || align=right | 1.2 km || 
|-id=113 bgcolor=#fefefe
| 226113 ||  || — || August 15, 2002 || Anderson Mesa || LONEOS || — || align=right | 1.2 km || 
|-id=114 bgcolor=#fefefe
| 226114 ||  || — || August 14, 2002 || Socorro || LINEAR || — || align=right | 1.0 km || 
|-id=115 bgcolor=#d6d6d6
| 226115 ||  || — || August 8, 2002 || Palomar || S. F. Hönig || — || align=right | 5.8 km || 
|-id=116 bgcolor=#fefefe
| 226116 ||  || — || August 11, 2002 || Palomar || NEAT || — || align=right data-sort-value="0.85" | 850 m || 
|-id=117 bgcolor=#d6d6d6
| 226117 ||  || — || August 15, 2002 || Palomar || NEAT || — || align=right | 4.1 km || 
|-id=118 bgcolor=#d6d6d6
| 226118 ||  || — || August 15, 2002 || Palomar || NEAT || — || align=right | 3.4 km || 
|-id=119 bgcolor=#fefefe
| 226119 ||  || — || August 11, 2002 || Palomar || NEAT || FLO || align=right data-sort-value="0.96" | 960 m || 
|-id=120 bgcolor=#fefefe
| 226120 ||  || — || August 15, 2002 || Palomar || NEAT || — || align=right data-sort-value="0.65" | 650 m || 
|-id=121 bgcolor=#d6d6d6
| 226121 ||  || — || August 16, 2002 || Haleakala || NEAT || — || align=right | 3.7 km || 
|-id=122 bgcolor=#fefefe
| 226122 ||  || — || August 18, 2002 || Palomar || NEAT || — || align=right data-sort-value="0.85" | 850 m || 
|-id=123 bgcolor=#d6d6d6
| 226123 ||  || — || August 28, 2002 || Palomar || NEAT || — || align=right | 5.2 km || 
|-id=124 bgcolor=#d6d6d6
| 226124 ||  || — || August 29, 2002 || Palomar || NEAT || — || align=right | 4.2 km || 
|-id=125 bgcolor=#fefefe
| 226125 ||  || — || August 29, 2002 || Palomar || NEAT || — || align=right data-sort-value="0.85" | 850 m || 
|-id=126 bgcolor=#fefefe
| 226126 ||  || — || September 4, 2002 || Anderson Mesa || LONEOS || — || align=right data-sort-value="0.83" | 830 m || 
|-id=127 bgcolor=#fefefe
| 226127 ||  || — || September 4, 2002 || Anderson Mesa || LONEOS || NYS || align=right data-sort-value="0.96" | 960 m || 
|-id=128 bgcolor=#fefefe
| 226128 ||  || — || September 4, 2002 || Anderson Mesa || LONEOS || FLO || align=right data-sort-value="0.84" | 840 m || 
|-id=129 bgcolor=#fefefe
| 226129 ||  || — || September 4, 2002 || Anderson Mesa || LONEOS || FLO || align=right data-sort-value="0.84" | 840 m || 
|-id=130 bgcolor=#fefefe
| 226130 ||  || — || September 4, 2002 || Anderson Mesa || LONEOS || NYS || align=right | 1.9 km || 
|-id=131 bgcolor=#FA8072
| 226131 ||  || — || September 5, 2002 || Socorro || LINEAR || — || align=right | 1.2 km || 
|-id=132 bgcolor=#fefefe
| 226132 ||  || — || September 5, 2002 || Socorro || LINEAR || — || align=right | 1.2 km || 
|-id=133 bgcolor=#fefefe
| 226133 ||  || — || September 5, 2002 || Socorro || LINEAR || — || align=right | 1.6 km || 
|-id=134 bgcolor=#fefefe
| 226134 ||  || — || September 5, 2002 || Socorro || LINEAR || FLO || align=right data-sort-value="0.94" | 940 m || 
|-id=135 bgcolor=#fefefe
| 226135 ||  || — || September 5, 2002 || Socorro || LINEAR || NYS || align=right | 2.3 km || 
|-id=136 bgcolor=#fefefe
| 226136 ||  || — || September 5, 2002 || Anderson Mesa || LONEOS || — || align=right data-sort-value="0.99" | 990 m || 
|-id=137 bgcolor=#fefefe
| 226137 ||  || — || September 5, 2002 || Anderson Mesa || LONEOS || FLO || align=right | 1.2 km || 
|-id=138 bgcolor=#fefefe
| 226138 ||  || — || September 8, 2002 || Haleakala || NEAT || FLO || align=right | 1.9 km || 
|-id=139 bgcolor=#fefefe
| 226139 ||  || — || September 9, 2002 || Campo Imperatore || CINEOS || — || align=right data-sort-value="0.98" | 980 m || 
|-id=140 bgcolor=#fefefe
| 226140 ||  || — || September 10, 2002 || Palomar || NEAT || V || align=right data-sort-value="0.88" | 880 m || 
|-id=141 bgcolor=#fefefe
| 226141 ||  || — || September 10, 2002 || Palomar || NEAT || — || align=right | 1.2 km || 
|-id=142 bgcolor=#fefefe
| 226142 ||  || — || September 11, 2002 || Palomar || NEAT || — || align=right data-sort-value="0.79" | 790 m || 
|-id=143 bgcolor=#fefefe
| 226143 ||  || — || September 11, 2002 || Palomar || NEAT || NYS || align=right data-sort-value="0.98" | 980 m || 
|-id=144 bgcolor=#fefefe
| 226144 ||  || — || September 13, 2002 || Palomar || NEAT || — || align=right data-sort-value="0.87" | 870 m || 
|-id=145 bgcolor=#fefefe
| 226145 ||  || — || September 13, 2002 || Palomar || NEAT || — || align=right data-sort-value="0.90" | 900 m || 
|-id=146 bgcolor=#fefefe
| 226146 ||  || — || September 14, 2002 || Palomar || NEAT || — || align=right data-sort-value="0.88" | 880 m || 
|-id=147 bgcolor=#fefefe
| 226147 ||  || — || September 9, 2002 || Palomar || NEAT || — || align=right data-sort-value="0.78" | 780 m || 
|-id=148 bgcolor=#d6d6d6
| 226148 ||  || — || September 10, 2002 || Palomar || NEAT || — || align=right | 4.9 km || 
|-id=149 bgcolor=#fefefe
| 226149 ||  || — || September 15, 2002 || Palomar || NEAT || — || align=right | 1.0 km || 
|-id=150 bgcolor=#fefefe
| 226150 ||  || — || September 11, 2002 || Palomar || NEAT || — || align=right data-sort-value="0.75" | 750 m || 
|-id=151 bgcolor=#fefefe
| 226151 ||  || — || September 26, 2002 || Palomar || NEAT || FLO || align=right data-sort-value="0.86" | 860 m || 
|-id=152 bgcolor=#fefefe
| 226152 ||  || — || September 27, 2002 || Palomar || NEAT || FLO || align=right data-sort-value="0.79" | 790 m || 
|-id=153 bgcolor=#fefefe
| 226153 ||  || — || September 27, 2002 || Palomar || NEAT || — || align=right data-sort-value="0.99" | 990 m || 
|-id=154 bgcolor=#fefefe
| 226154 ||  || — || September 28, 2002 || Palomar || NEAT || FLO || align=right data-sort-value="0.89" | 890 m || 
|-id=155 bgcolor=#fefefe
| 226155 ||  || — || September 26, 2002 || Palomar || NEAT || NYS || align=right | 1.1 km || 
|-id=156 bgcolor=#fefefe
| 226156 ||  || — || September 28, 2002 || Haleakala || NEAT || — || align=right | 1.3 km || 
|-id=157 bgcolor=#fefefe
| 226157 ||  || — || September 29, 2002 || Haleakala || NEAT || V || align=right | 1.1 km || 
|-id=158 bgcolor=#fefefe
| 226158 ||  || — || September 29, 2002 || Haleakala || NEAT || FLO || align=right data-sort-value="0.96" | 960 m || 
|-id=159 bgcolor=#fefefe
| 226159 ||  || — || September 29, 2002 || Kitt Peak || Spacewatch || — || align=right | 2.3 km || 
|-id=160 bgcolor=#fefefe
| 226160 ||  || — || September 30, 2002 || Haleakala || NEAT || — || align=right | 1.3 km || 
|-id=161 bgcolor=#fefefe
| 226161 ||  || — || September 30, 2002 || Haleakala || NEAT || — || align=right | 1.1 km || 
|-id=162 bgcolor=#fefefe
| 226162 ||  || — || October 2, 2002 || Socorro || LINEAR || — || align=right | 1.3 km || 
|-id=163 bgcolor=#fefefe
| 226163 ||  || — || October 2, 2002 || Socorro || LINEAR || fast? || align=right data-sort-value="0.96" | 960 m || 
|-id=164 bgcolor=#fefefe
| 226164 ||  || — || October 2, 2002 || Socorro || LINEAR || — || align=right data-sort-value="0.99" | 990 m || 
|-id=165 bgcolor=#fefefe
| 226165 ||  || — || October 2, 2002 || Socorro || LINEAR || — || align=right data-sort-value="0.94" | 940 m || 
|-id=166 bgcolor=#fefefe
| 226166 ||  || — || October 2, 2002 || Socorro || LINEAR || FLO || align=right data-sort-value="0.96" | 960 m || 
|-id=167 bgcolor=#fefefe
| 226167 ||  || — || October 2, 2002 || Socorro || LINEAR || — || align=right | 1.1 km || 
|-id=168 bgcolor=#fefefe
| 226168 ||  || — || October 1, 2002 || Anderson Mesa || LONEOS || V || align=right data-sort-value="0.88" | 880 m || 
|-id=169 bgcolor=#fefefe
| 226169 ||  || — || October 3, 2002 || Socorro || LINEAR || — || align=right data-sort-value="0.90" | 900 m || 
|-id=170 bgcolor=#fefefe
| 226170 ||  || — || October 3, 2002 || Campo Imperatore || CINEOS || FLO || align=right | 1.2 km || 
|-id=171 bgcolor=#fefefe
| 226171 ||  || — || October 3, 2002 || Palomar || NEAT || — || align=right | 1.6 km || 
|-id=172 bgcolor=#fefefe
| 226172 ||  || — || October 3, 2002 || Palomar || NEAT || V || align=right | 1.1 km || 
|-id=173 bgcolor=#fefefe
| 226173 ||  || — || October 1, 2002 || Haleakala || NEAT || — || align=right | 1.2 km || 
|-id=174 bgcolor=#fefefe
| 226174 ||  || — || October 3, 2002 || Palomar || NEAT || — || align=right | 1.2 km || 
|-id=175 bgcolor=#fefefe
| 226175 ||  || — || October 2, 2002 || Campo Imperatore || CINEOS || — || align=right | 1.3 km || 
|-id=176 bgcolor=#fefefe
| 226176 ||  || — || October 4, 2002 || Socorro || LINEAR || — || align=right | 1.2 km || 
|-id=177 bgcolor=#fefefe
| 226177 ||  || — || October 3, 2002 || Socorro || LINEAR || — || align=right | 1.2 km || 
|-id=178 bgcolor=#fefefe
| 226178 ||  || — || October 4, 2002 || Palomar || NEAT || — || align=right | 1.3 km || 
|-id=179 bgcolor=#fefefe
| 226179 ||  || — || October 4, 2002 || Anderson Mesa || LONEOS || — || align=right | 1.2 km || 
|-id=180 bgcolor=#fefefe
| 226180 ||  || — || October 5, 2002 || Palomar || NEAT || FLO || align=right data-sort-value="0.92" | 920 m || 
|-id=181 bgcolor=#fefefe
| 226181 ||  || — || October 5, 2002 || Palomar || NEAT || — || align=right | 1.3 km || 
|-id=182 bgcolor=#d6d6d6
| 226182 ||  || — || October 5, 2002 || Palomar || NEAT || — || align=right | 4.5 km || 
|-id=183 bgcolor=#fefefe
| 226183 ||  || — || October 5, 2002 || Socorro || LINEAR || — || align=right | 1.7 km || 
|-id=184 bgcolor=#fefefe
| 226184 ||  || — || October 3, 2002 || Socorro || LINEAR || V || align=right data-sort-value="0.94" | 940 m || 
|-id=185 bgcolor=#fefefe
| 226185 ||  || — || October 4, 2002 || Socorro || LINEAR || — || align=right | 1.0 km || 
|-id=186 bgcolor=#fefefe
| 226186 ||  || — || October 7, 2002 || Socorro || LINEAR || FLO || align=right | 1.1 km || 
|-id=187 bgcolor=#fefefe
| 226187 ||  || — || October 7, 2002 || Haleakala || NEAT || V || align=right | 1.0 km || 
|-id=188 bgcolor=#fefefe
| 226188 ||  || — || October 6, 2002 || Haleakala || NEAT || — || align=right | 1.3 km || 
|-id=189 bgcolor=#fefefe
| 226189 ||  || — || October 8, 2002 || Anderson Mesa || LONEOS || — || align=right | 1.2 km || 
|-id=190 bgcolor=#fefefe
| 226190 ||  || — || October 8, 2002 || Anderson Mesa || LONEOS || FLO || align=right data-sort-value="0.80" | 800 m || 
|-id=191 bgcolor=#fefefe
| 226191 ||  || — || October 9, 2002 || Socorro || LINEAR || — || align=right | 1.8 km || 
|-id=192 bgcolor=#fefefe
| 226192 ||  || — || October 10, 2002 || Socorro || LINEAR || — || align=right | 1.2 km || 
|-id=193 bgcolor=#fefefe
| 226193 ||  || — || October 10, 2002 || Socorro || LINEAR || — || align=right | 1.4 km || 
|-id=194 bgcolor=#fefefe
| 226194 ||  || — || October 5, 2002 || Apache Point || SDSS || NYS || align=right data-sort-value="0.74" | 740 m || 
|-id=195 bgcolor=#fefefe
| 226195 ||  || — || October 10, 2002 || Apache Point || SDSS || — || align=right | 1.7 km || 
|-id=196 bgcolor=#fefefe
| 226196 ||  || — || October 3, 2002 || Socorro || LINEAR || — || align=right data-sort-value="0.69" | 690 m || 
|-id=197 bgcolor=#fefefe
| 226197 ||  || — || October 3, 2002 || Socorro || LINEAR || V || align=right data-sort-value="0.76" | 760 m || 
|-id=198 bgcolor=#FFC2E0
| 226198 ||  || — || October 28, 2002 || Palomar || NEAT || AMO || align=right data-sort-value="0.61" | 610 m || 
|-id=199 bgcolor=#fefefe
| 226199 ||  || — || October 28, 2002 || Haleakala || NEAT || — || align=right | 1.3 km || 
|-id=200 bgcolor=#fefefe
| 226200 ||  || — || October 30, 2002 || Kitt Peak || Spacewatch || V || align=right data-sort-value="0.79" | 790 m || 
|}

226201–226300 

|-bgcolor=#FA8072
| 226201 ||  || — || October 31, 2002 || Socorro || LINEAR || — || align=right | 1.3 km || 
|-id=202 bgcolor=#fefefe
| 226202 ||  || — || November 1, 2002 || Haleakala || NEAT || NYS || align=right data-sort-value="0.63" | 630 m || 
|-id=203 bgcolor=#fefefe
| 226203 ||  || — || November 1, 2002 || Palomar || NEAT || — || align=right | 1.2 km || 
|-id=204 bgcolor=#fefefe
| 226204 ||  || — || November 1, 2002 || Palomar || NEAT || — || align=right | 1.3 km || 
|-id=205 bgcolor=#fefefe
| 226205 ||  || — || November 4, 2002 || Palomar || NEAT || FLO || align=right | 2.4 km || 
|-id=206 bgcolor=#fefefe
| 226206 ||  || — || November 5, 2002 || Socorro || LINEAR || V || align=right | 1.1 km || 
|-id=207 bgcolor=#fefefe
| 226207 ||  || — || November 5, 2002 || La Palma || La Palma Obs. || V || align=right data-sort-value="0.80" | 800 m || 
|-id=208 bgcolor=#fefefe
| 226208 ||  || — || November 5, 2002 || Socorro || LINEAR || PHO || align=right | 1.6 km || 
|-id=209 bgcolor=#fefefe
| 226209 ||  || — || November 5, 2002 || Anderson Mesa || LONEOS || V || align=right data-sort-value="0.92" | 920 m || 
|-id=210 bgcolor=#fefefe
| 226210 ||  || — || November 5, 2002 || Socorro || LINEAR || — || align=right data-sort-value="0.94" | 940 m || 
|-id=211 bgcolor=#fefefe
| 226211 ||  || — || November 5, 2002 || Anderson Mesa || LONEOS || — || align=right data-sort-value="0.92" | 920 m || 
|-id=212 bgcolor=#fefefe
| 226212 ||  || — || November 5, 2002 || Anderson Mesa || LONEOS || — || align=right | 1.1 km || 
|-id=213 bgcolor=#FA8072
| 226213 ||  || — || November 6, 2002 || Anderson Mesa || LONEOS || — || align=right | 1.00 km || 
|-id=214 bgcolor=#fefefe
| 226214 ||  || — || November 6, 2002 || Haleakala || NEAT || — || align=right | 2.7 km || 
|-id=215 bgcolor=#fefefe
| 226215 ||  || — || November 5, 2002 || Socorro || LINEAR || FLO || align=right data-sort-value="0.99" | 990 m || 
|-id=216 bgcolor=#fefefe
| 226216 ||  || — || November 6, 2002 || Anderson Mesa || LONEOS || — || align=right | 1.4 km || 
|-id=217 bgcolor=#fefefe
| 226217 ||  || — || November 6, 2002 || Anderson Mesa || LONEOS || V || align=right | 1.0 km || 
|-id=218 bgcolor=#fefefe
| 226218 ||  || — || November 6, 2002 || Socorro || LINEAR || NYS || align=right | 2.3 km || 
|-id=219 bgcolor=#FFC2E0
| 226219 ||  || — || November 12, 2002 || Socorro || LINEAR || AMO +1km || align=right data-sort-value="0.93" | 930 m || 
|-id=220 bgcolor=#fefefe
| 226220 ||  || — || November 12, 2002 || Socorro || LINEAR || NYS || align=right | 2.4 km || 
|-id=221 bgcolor=#fefefe
| 226221 ||  || — || November 12, 2002 || Socorro || LINEAR || — || align=right | 1.6 km || 
|-id=222 bgcolor=#fefefe
| 226222 ||  || — || November 12, 2002 || Socorro || LINEAR || FLO || align=right | 1.2 km || 
|-id=223 bgcolor=#fefefe
| 226223 ||  || — || November 12, 2002 || Socorro || LINEAR || V || align=right data-sort-value="0.90" | 900 m || 
|-id=224 bgcolor=#fefefe
| 226224 ||  || — || November 12, 2002 || Socorro || LINEAR || PHO || align=right | 3.9 km || 
|-id=225 bgcolor=#fefefe
| 226225 ||  || — || November 12, 2002 || Palomar || NEAT || FLO || align=right | 1.5 km || 
|-id=226 bgcolor=#fefefe
| 226226 ||  || — || November 5, 2002 || Nyukasa || Mount Nyukasa Stn. || — || align=right | 1.0 km || 
|-id=227 bgcolor=#fefefe
| 226227 ||  || — || November 6, 2002 || Anderson Mesa || LONEOS || — || align=right | 1.2 km || 
|-id=228 bgcolor=#fefefe
| 226228 ||  || — || November 7, 2002 || Socorro || LINEAR || — || align=right | 1.1 km || 
|-id=229 bgcolor=#fefefe
| 226229 ||  || — || November 13, 2002 || Palomar || NEAT || — || align=right | 1.3 km || 
|-id=230 bgcolor=#fefefe
| 226230 ||  || — || November 4, 2002 || Palomar || NEAT || — || align=right data-sort-value="0.82" | 820 m || 
|-id=231 bgcolor=#fefefe
| 226231 ||  || — || November 24, 2002 || Palomar || NEAT || V || align=right | 1.1 km || 
|-id=232 bgcolor=#fefefe
| 226232 ||  || — || November 24, 2002 || Palomar || NEAT || NYS || align=right | 1.00 km || 
|-id=233 bgcolor=#d6d6d6
| 226233 ||  || — || November 25, 2002 || Palomar || S. F. Hönig || SHU3:2 || align=right | 7.1 km || 
|-id=234 bgcolor=#fefefe
| 226234 ||  || — || November 22, 2002 || Palomar || NEAT || FLO || align=right data-sort-value="0.64" | 640 m || 
|-id=235 bgcolor=#fefefe
| 226235 ||  || — || November 24, 2002 || Palomar || NEAT || — || align=right data-sort-value="0.93" | 930 m || 
|-id=236 bgcolor=#fefefe
| 226236 ||  || — || December 3, 2002 || Palomar || NEAT || V || align=right | 1.0 km || 
|-id=237 bgcolor=#FA8072
| 226237 ||  || — || December 5, 2002 || Socorro || LINEAR || — || align=right | 1.4 km || 
|-id=238 bgcolor=#fefefe
| 226238 ||  || — || December 5, 2002 || Socorro || LINEAR || — || align=right | 1.5 km || 
|-id=239 bgcolor=#fefefe
| 226239 ||  || — || December 5, 2002 || Socorro || LINEAR || NYS || align=right | 2.7 km || 
|-id=240 bgcolor=#fefefe
| 226240 ||  || — || December 6, 2002 || Socorro || LINEAR || V || align=right | 1.0 km || 
|-id=241 bgcolor=#fefefe
| 226241 ||  || — || December 8, 2002 || Desert Eagle || W. K. Y. Yeung || V || align=right data-sort-value="0.94" | 940 m || 
|-id=242 bgcolor=#fefefe
| 226242 ||  || — || December 6, 2002 || Socorro || LINEAR || — || align=right | 1.1 km || 
|-id=243 bgcolor=#fefefe
| 226243 ||  || — || December 8, 2002 || Haleakala || NEAT || V || align=right | 1.0 km || 
|-id=244 bgcolor=#fefefe
| 226244 ||  || — || December 10, 2002 || Socorro || LINEAR || — || align=right | 1.4 km || 
|-id=245 bgcolor=#fefefe
| 226245 ||  || — || December 10, 2002 || Socorro || LINEAR || NYS || align=right | 1.1 km || 
|-id=246 bgcolor=#fefefe
| 226246 ||  || — || December 10, 2002 || Socorro || LINEAR || V || align=right | 1.1 km || 
|-id=247 bgcolor=#fefefe
| 226247 ||  || — || December 11, 2002 || Socorro || LINEAR || — || align=right | 1.4 km || 
|-id=248 bgcolor=#fefefe
| 226248 ||  || — || December 11, 2002 || Socorro || LINEAR || NYS || align=right | 2.1 km || 
|-id=249 bgcolor=#fefefe
| 226249 ||  || — || December 11, 2002 || Socorro || LINEAR || FLO || align=right | 1.4 km || 
|-id=250 bgcolor=#fefefe
| 226250 ||  || — || December 5, 2002 || Socorro || LINEAR || NYS || align=right | 1.8 km || 
|-id=251 bgcolor=#fefefe
| 226251 ||  || — || December 27, 2002 || Anderson Mesa || LONEOS || ERI || align=right | 3.0 km || 
|-id=252 bgcolor=#fefefe
| 226252 ||  || — || December 26, 2002 || Nogales || Tenagra II Obs. || LCI || align=right | 1.5 km || 
|-id=253 bgcolor=#fefefe
| 226253 ||  || — || December 28, 2002 || Anderson Mesa || LONEOS || — || align=right | 1.6 km || 
|-id=254 bgcolor=#fefefe
| 226254 ||  || — || December 31, 2002 || Socorro || LINEAR || — || align=right | 2.5 km || 
|-id=255 bgcolor=#fefefe
| 226255 ||  || — || December 31, 2002 || Socorro || LINEAR || FLO || align=right | 1.2 km || 
|-id=256 bgcolor=#fefefe
| 226256 ||  || — || December 31, 2002 || Socorro || LINEAR || NYS || align=right data-sort-value="0.86" | 860 m || 
|-id=257 bgcolor=#fefefe
| 226257 ||  || — || December 31, 2002 || Socorro || LINEAR || — || align=right | 1.4 km || 
|-id=258 bgcolor=#fefefe
| 226258 || 2003 AH || — || January 1, 2003 || Socorro || LINEAR || — || align=right | 2.8 km || 
|-id=259 bgcolor=#fefefe
| 226259 || 2003 AQ || — || January 1, 2003 || Socorro || LINEAR || — || align=right | 1.8 km || 
|-id=260 bgcolor=#fefefe
| 226260 ||  || — || January 4, 2003 || Socorro || LINEAR || FLO || align=right | 1.2 km || 
|-id=261 bgcolor=#fefefe
| 226261 ||  || — || January 4, 2003 || Socorro || LINEAR || — || align=right | 3.6 km || 
|-id=262 bgcolor=#fefefe
| 226262 ||  || — || January 4, 2003 || Kitt Peak || Spacewatch || NYS || align=right data-sort-value="0.82" | 820 m || 
|-id=263 bgcolor=#fefefe
| 226263 ||  || — || January 5, 2003 || Socorro || LINEAR || FLO || align=right | 1.9 km || 
|-id=264 bgcolor=#fefefe
| 226264 ||  || — || January 7, 2003 || Socorro || LINEAR || — || align=right | 1.2 km || 
|-id=265 bgcolor=#fefefe
| 226265 ||  || — || January 5, 2003 || Socorro || LINEAR || — || align=right | 1.4 km || 
|-id=266 bgcolor=#fefefe
| 226266 ||  || — || January 5, 2003 || Socorro || LINEAR || NYS || align=right data-sort-value="0.74" | 740 m || 
|-id=267 bgcolor=#fefefe
| 226267 ||  || — || January 5, 2003 || Socorro || LINEAR || NYS || align=right data-sort-value="0.89" | 890 m || 
|-id=268 bgcolor=#fefefe
| 226268 ||  || — || January 5, 2003 || Socorro || LINEAR || — || align=right | 2.7 km || 
|-id=269 bgcolor=#fefefe
| 226269 ||  || — || January 5, 2003 || Socorro || LINEAR || — || align=right | 3.1 km || 
|-id=270 bgcolor=#fefefe
| 226270 ||  || — || January 8, 2003 || Socorro || LINEAR || FLO || align=right data-sort-value="0.99" | 990 m || 
|-id=271 bgcolor=#fefefe
| 226271 ||  || — || January 7, 2003 || Socorro || LINEAR || V || align=right data-sort-value="0.98" | 980 m || 
|-id=272 bgcolor=#fefefe
| 226272 ||  || — || January 8, 2003 || Socorro || LINEAR || — || align=right data-sort-value="0.92" | 920 m || 
|-id=273 bgcolor=#fefefe
| 226273 ||  || — || January 10, 2003 || Socorro || LINEAR || — || align=right | 1.7 km || 
|-id=274 bgcolor=#fefefe
| 226274 ||  || — || January 10, 2003 || Kitt Peak || Spacewatch || NYS || align=right data-sort-value="0.72" | 720 m || 
|-id=275 bgcolor=#fefefe
| 226275 ||  || — || January 10, 2003 || Socorro || LINEAR || PHO || align=right | 2.1 km || 
|-id=276 bgcolor=#fefefe
| 226276 ||  || — || January 11, 2003 || Socorro || LINEAR || PHO || align=right | 1.4 km || 
|-id=277 bgcolor=#fefefe
| 226277 ||  || — || January 9, 2003 || Socorro || LINEAR || NYS || align=right | 1.1 km || 
|-id=278 bgcolor=#fefefe
| 226278 ||  || — || January 9, 2003 || Socorro || LINEAR || — || align=right | 1.1 km || 
|-id=279 bgcolor=#fefefe
| 226279 || 2003 BN || — || January 23, 2003 || Needville || J. Dellinger || MAS || align=right | 1.1 km || 
|-id=280 bgcolor=#fefefe
| 226280 ||  || — || January 26, 2003 || Anderson Mesa || LONEOS || — || align=right | 1.7 km || 
|-id=281 bgcolor=#fefefe
| 226281 ||  || — || January 23, 2003 || Kvistaberg || UDAS || — || align=right | 1.2 km || 
|-id=282 bgcolor=#E9E9E9
| 226282 ||  || — || January 26, 2003 || Haleakala || NEAT || — || align=right | 2.3 km || 
|-id=283 bgcolor=#fefefe
| 226283 ||  || — || January 26, 2003 || Haleakala || NEAT || NYS || align=right | 1.1 km || 
|-id=284 bgcolor=#fefefe
| 226284 ||  || — || January 26, 2003 || Haleakala || NEAT || — || align=right | 1.2 km || 
|-id=285 bgcolor=#fefefe
| 226285 ||  || — || January 27, 2003 || Socorro || LINEAR || — || align=right | 1.5 km || 
|-id=286 bgcolor=#fefefe
| 226286 ||  || — || January 27, 2003 || Anderson Mesa || LONEOS || NYS || align=right data-sort-value="0.95" | 950 m || 
|-id=287 bgcolor=#fefefe
| 226287 ||  || — || January 27, 2003 || Socorro || LINEAR || — || align=right | 1.3 km || 
|-id=288 bgcolor=#d6d6d6
| 226288 ||  || — || January 27, 2003 || Socorro || LINEAR || 3:2 || align=right | 4.6 km || 
|-id=289 bgcolor=#fefefe
| 226289 ||  || — || January 27, 2003 || Anderson Mesa || LONEOS || MAS || align=right | 1.1 km || 
|-id=290 bgcolor=#fefefe
| 226290 ||  || — || January 27, 2003 || Anderson Mesa || LONEOS || — || align=right | 1.6 km || 
|-id=291 bgcolor=#fefefe
| 226291 ||  || — || January 29, 2003 || Kitt Peak || Spacewatch || — || align=right | 1.0 km || 
|-id=292 bgcolor=#fefefe
| 226292 ||  || — || January 27, 2003 || Socorro || LINEAR || V || align=right data-sort-value="0.99" | 990 m || 
|-id=293 bgcolor=#fefefe
| 226293 ||  || — || January 27, 2003 || Socorro || LINEAR || V || align=right | 1.0 km || 
|-id=294 bgcolor=#fefefe
| 226294 ||  || — || January 27, 2003 || Anderson Mesa || LONEOS || — || align=right data-sort-value="0.94" | 940 m || 
|-id=295 bgcolor=#d6d6d6
| 226295 ||  || — || January 27, 2003 || Haleakala || NEAT || HIL3:2 || align=right | 7.7 km || 
|-id=296 bgcolor=#fefefe
| 226296 ||  || — || January 30, 2003 || Anderson Mesa || LONEOS || — || align=right | 1.4 km || 
|-id=297 bgcolor=#fefefe
| 226297 ||  || — || January 28, 2003 || Kitt Peak || Spacewatch || — || align=right | 1.1 km || 
|-id=298 bgcolor=#fefefe
| 226298 ||  || — || January 29, 2003 || Palomar || NEAT || — || align=right | 1.0 km || 
|-id=299 bgcolor=#fefefe
| 226299 ||  || — || January 29, 2003 || Kvistaberg || UDAS || NYS || align=right data-sort-value="0.91" | 910 m || 
|-id=300 bgcolor=#fefefe
| 226300 ||  || — || January 30, 2003 || Kitt Peak || Spacewatch || NYS || align=right data-sort-value="0.77" | 770 m || 
|}

226301–226400 

|-bgcolor=#fefefe
| 226301 ||  || — || January 29, 2003 || Palomar || NEAT || — || align=right | 1.4 km || 
|-id=302 bgcolor=#fefefe
| 226302 ||  || — || January 29, 2003 || Palomar || NEAT || — || align=right | 1.5 km || 
|-id=303 bgcolor=#fefefe
| 226303 ||  || — || January 30, 2003 || Anderson Mesa || LONEOS || NYS || align=right | 2.0 km || 
|-id=304 bgcolor=#fefefe
| 226304 ||  || — || January 30, 2003 || Anderson Mesa || LONEOS || NYS || align=right | 1.1 km || 
|-id=305 bgcolor=#fefefe
| 226305 ||  || — || January 28, 2003 || Socorro || LINEAR || — || align=right | 1.4 km || 
|-id=306 bgcolor=#fefefe
| 226306 ||  || — || January 30, 2003 || Anderson Mesa || LONEOS || — || align=right | 2.9 km || 
|-id=307 bgcolor=#E9E9E9
| 226307 ||  || — || January 30, 2003 || Anderson Mesa || LONEOS || — || align=right | 1.6 km || 
|-id=308 bgcolor=#fefefe
| 226308 ||  || — || February 1, 2003 || Haleakala || NEAT || — || align=right | 2.4 km || 
|-id=309 bgcolor=#fefefe
| 226309 ||  || — || February 1, 2003 || Socorro || LINEAR || MAS || align=right | 1.1 km || 
|-id=310 bgcolor=#fefefe
| 226310 ||  || — || February 1, 2003 || Socorro || LINEAR || NYS || align=right | 1.2 km || 
|-id=311 bgcolor=#fefefe
| 226311 ||  || — || February 1, 2003 || Socorro || LINEAR || NYS || align=right | 1.00 km || 
|-id=312 bgcolor=#fefefe
| 226312 ||  || — || February 2, 2003 || Palomar || NEAT || — || align=right data-sort-value="0.89" | 890 m || 
|-id=313 bgcolor=#fefefe
| 226313 ||  || — || February 8, 2003 || Socorro || LINEAR || MAS || align=right | 1.0 km || 
|-id=314 bgcolor=#fefefe
| 226314 ||  || — || February 22, 2003 || Palomar || NEAT || NYS || align=right data-sort-value="0.81" | 810 m || 
|-id=315 bgcolor=#E9E9E9
| 226315 ||  || — || February 22, 2003 || Palomar || NEAT || — || align=right | 2.6 km || 
|-id=316 bgcolor=#fefefe
| 226316 ||  || — || February 25, 2003 || Campo Imperatore || CINEOS || MAS || align=right data-sort-value="0.85" | 850 m || 
|-id=317 bgcolor=#fefefe
| 226317 ||  || — || February 27, 2003 || Kleť || M. Tichý, M. Kočer || — || align=right | 1.2 km || 
|-id=318 bgcolor=#fefefe
| 226318 ||  || — || February 19, 2003 || Palomar || NEAT || — || align=right | 1.4 km || 
|-id=319 bgcolor=#fefefe
| 226319 ||  || — || February 22, 2003 || Palomar || NEAT || NYS || align=right data-sort-value="0.92" | 920 m || 
|-id=320 bgcolor=#fefefe
| 226320 ||  || — || March 6, 2003 || Socorro || LINEAR || — || align=right | 1.4 km || 
|-id=321 bgcolor=#fefefe
| 226321 ||  || — || March 6, 2003 || Socorro || LINEAR || — || align=right | 1.5 km || 
|-id=322 bgcolor=#fefefe
| 226322 ||  || — || March 6, 2003 || Anderson Mesa || LONEOS || NYS || align=right data-sort-value="0.84" | 840 m || 
|-id=323 bgcolor=#fefefe
| 226323 ||  || — || March 6, 2003 || Anderson Mesa || LONEOS || — || align=right | 1.5 km || 
|-id=324 bgcolor=#fefefe
| 226324 ||  || — || March 6, 2003 || Anderson Mesa || LONEOS || NYS || align=right data-sort-value="0.99" | 990 m || 
|-id=325 bgcolor=#fefefe
| 226325 ||  || — || March 6, 2003 || Anderson Mesa || LONEOS || V || align=right | 1.1 km || 
|-id=326 bgcolor=#E9E9E9
| 226326 ||  || — || March 6, 2003 || Socorro || LINEAR || — || align=right | 3.4 km || 
|-id=327 bgcolor=#fefefe
| 226327 ||  || — || March 7, 2003 || Socorro || LINEAR || — || align=right | 1.1 km || 
|-id=328 bgcolor=#E9E9E9
| 226328 ||  || — || March 8, 2003 || Anderson Mesa || LONEOS || MAR || align=right | 1.5 km || 
|-id=329 bgcolor=#fefefe
| 226329 ||  || — || March 7, 2003 || Palomar || NEAT || V || align=right | 1.1 km || 
|-id=330 bgcolor=#E9E9E9
| 226330 ||  || — || March 9, 2003 || Socorro || LINEAR || MIS || align=right | 4.1 km || 
|-id=331 bgcolor=#E9E9E9
| 226331 || 2003 FL || — || March 22, 2003 || Wrightwood || J. W. Young || — || align=right | 1.3 km || 
|-id=332 bgcolor=#E9E9E9
| 226332 ||  || — || March 25, 2003 || Kitt Peak || Spacewatch || — || align=right | 1.8 km || 
|-id=333 bgcolor=#E9E9E9
| 226333 ||  || — || March 24, 2003 || Kitt Peak || Spacewatch || — || align=right | 2.9 km || 
|-id=334 bgcolor=#fefefe
| 226334 ||  || — || March 25, 2003 || Haleakala || NEAT || FLO || align=right | 1.3 km || 
|-id=335 bgcolor=#E9E9E9
| 226335 ||  || — || March 24, 2003 || Kitt Peak || Spacewatch || — || align=right | 1.1 km || 
|-id=336 bgcolor=#E9E9E9
| 226336 ||  || — || March 24, 2003 || Kitt Peak || Spacewatch || — || align=right | 1.3 km || 
|-id=337 bgcolor=#E9E9E9
| 226337 ||  || — || March 26, 2003 || Kitt Peak || Spacewatch || — || align=right | 4.0 km || 
|-id=338 bgcolor=#E9E9E9
| 226338 ||  || — || March 26, 2003 || Kitt Peak || Spacewatch || — || align=right | 2.4 km || 
|-id=339 bgcolor=#fefefe
| 226339 ||  || — || March 26, 2003 || Palomar || NEAT || — || align=right | 1.4 km || 
|-id=340 bgcolor=#E9E9E9
| 226340 ||  || — || March 27, 2003 || Palomar || NEAT || — || align=right | 1.6 km || 
|-id=341 bgcolor=#E9E9E9
| 226341 ||  || — || March 27, 2003 || Palomar || NEAT || — || align=right | 1.6 km || 
|-id=342 bgcolor=#fefefe
| 226342 ||  || — || March 27, 2003 || Kitt Peak || Spacewatch || NYS || align=right data-sort-value="0.98" | 980 m || 
|-id=343 bgcolor=#E9E9E9
| 226343 ||  || — || March 23, 2003 || Kitt Peak || Spacewatch || — || align=right | 1.4 km || 
|-id=344 bgcolor=#E9E9E9
| 226344 ||  || — || March 25, 2003 || Anderson Mesa || LONEOS || — || align=right | 1.7 km || 
|-id=345 bgcolor=#E9E9E9
| 226345 ||  || — || March 31, 2003 || Cerro Tololo || DLS || — || align=right data-sort-value="0.98" | 980 m || 
|-id=346 bgcolor=#E9E9E9
| 226346 ||  || — || March 31, 2003 || Kitt Peak || Spacewatch || — || align=right | 1.4 km || 
|-id=347 bgcolor=#E9E9E9
| 226347 ||  || — || March 23, 2003 || Kitt Peak || Spacewatch || — || align=right | 1.4 km || 
|-id=348 bgcolor=#C2FFFF
| 226348 ||  || — || March 23, 2003 || Kitt Peak || Spacewatch || L4 || align=right | 11 km || 
|-id=349 bgcolor=#C2FFFF
| 226349 ||  || — || March 27, 2003 || Kitt Peak || Spacewatch || L4 || align=right | 13 km || 
|-id=350 bgcolor=#E9E9E9
| 226350 ||  || — || April 3, 2003 || Anderson Mesa || LONEOS || — || align=right | 3.9 km || 
|-id=351 bgcolor=#E9E9E9
| 226351 ||  || — || April 3, 2003 || Anderson Mesa || LONEOS || — || align=right | 1.3 km || 
|-id=352 bgcolor=#C2FFFF
| 226352 ||  || — || April 4, 2003 || Kitt Peak || Spacewatch || L4 || align=right | 11 km || 
|-id=353 bgcolor=#fefefe
| 226353 ||  || — || April 6, 2003 || Socorro || LINEAR || PHO || align=right | 1.9 km || 
|-id=354 bgcolor=#E9E9E9
| 226354 ||  || — || April 3, 2003 || Anderson Mesa || LONEOS || — || align=right | 3.6 km || 
|-id=355 bgcolor=#C2FFFF
| 226355 ||  || — || April 7, 2003 || Kitt Peak || Spacewatch || L4 || align=right | 13 km || 
|-id=356 bgcolor=#fefefe
| 226356 ||  || — || April 1, 2003 || Kitt Peak || M. W. Buie || MAS || align=right | 1.2 km || 
|-id=357 bgcolor=#E9E9E9
| 226357 ||  || — || April 4, 2003 || Kitt Peak || Spacewatch || — || align=right | 1.2 km || 
|-id=358 bgcolor=#C2FFFF
| 226358 ||  || — || April 7, 2003 || Kitt Peak || Spacewatch || L4 || align=right | 12 km || 
|-id=359 bgcolor=#fefefe
| 226359 ||  || — || April 25, 2003 || Socorro || LINEAR || H || align=right | 1.2 km || 
|-id=360 bgcolor=#fefefe
| 226360 ||  || — || April 24, 2003 || Anderson Mesa || LONEOS || — || align=right | 1.1 km || 
|-id=361 bgcolor=#C2FFFF
| 226361 ||  || — || April 25, 2003 || Kitt Peak || Spacewatch || L4 || align=right | 15 km || 
|-id=362 bgcolor=#E9E9E9
| 226362 ||  || — || April 26, 2003 || Kitt Peak || Spacewatch || ADE || align=right | 3.6 km || 
|-id=363 bgcolor=#E9E9E9
| 226363 ||  || — || April 28, 2003 || Socorro || LINEAR || — || align=right | 3.9 km || 
|-id=364 bgcolor=#E9E9E9
| 226364 ||  || — || April 29, 2003 || Anderson Mesa || LONEOS || — || align=right | 2.9 km || 
|-id=365 bgcolor=#E9E9E9
| 226365 ||  || — || April 29, 2003 || Socorro || LINEAR || — || align=right | 1.6 km || 
|-id=366 bgcolor=#E9E9E9
| 226366 ||  || — || April 28, 2003 || Socorro || LINEAR || — || align=right | 1.8 km || 
|-id=367 bgcolor=#C2FFFF
| 226367 ||  || — || April 28, 2003 || Kitt Peak || Spacewatch || L4 || align=right | 14 km || 
|-id=368 bgcolor=#E9E9E9
| 226368 ||  || — || May 1, 2003 || Kitt Peak || Spacewatch || — || align=right | 1.5 km || 
|-id=369 bgcolor=#E9E9E9
| 226369 ||  || — || May 1, 2003 || Socorro || LINEAR || — || align=right | 4.3 km || 
|-id=370 bgcolor=#E9E9E9
| 226370 ||  || — || May 1, 2003 || Kitt Peak || Spacewatch || MAR || align=right | 1.6 km || 
|-id=371 bgcolor=#E9E9E9
| 226371 ||  || — || May 2, 2003 || Socorro || LINEAR || — || align=right | 3.6 km || 
|-id=372 bgcolor=#E9E9E9
| 226372 ||  || — || May 2, 2003 || Socorro || LINEAR || — || align=right | 1.6 km || 
|-id=373 bgcolor=#E9E9E9
| 226373 ||  || — || May 1, 2003 || Haleakala || NEAT || — || align=right | 2.0 km || 
|-id=374 bgcolor=#E9E9E9
| 226374 ||  || — || May 3, 2003 || Kitt Peak || Spacewatch || — || align=right | 1.4 km || 
|-id=375 bgcolor=#fefefe
| 226375 ||  || — || May 26, 2003 || Kitt Peak || Spacewatch || H || align=right | 1.0 km || 
|-id=376 bgcolor=#E9E9E9
| 226376 ||  || — || May 26, 2003 || Kitt Peak || Spacewatch || — || align=right | 1.1 km || 
|-id=377 bgcolor=#E9E9E9
| 226377 ||  || — || May 25, 2003 || Kitt Peak || Spacewatch || — || align=right | 1.5 km || 
|-id=378 bgcolor=#E9E9E9
| 226378 ||  || — || May 26, 2003 || Kitt Peak || Spacewatch || — || align=right | 2.7 km || 
|-id=379 bgcolor=#E9E9E9
| 226379 ||  || — || May 27, 2003 || Kitt Peak || Spacewatch || WIT || align=right | 1.5 km || 
|-id=380 bgcolor=#E9E9E9
| 226380 ||  || — || May 27, 2003 || Kitt Peak || Spacewatch || — || align=right | 1.2 km || 
|-id=381 bgcolor=#d6d6d6
| 226381 ||  || — || July 2, 2003 || Socorro || LINEAR || JLI || align=right | 6.6 km || 
|-id=382 bgcolor=#d6d6d6
| 226382 ||  || — || July 3, 2003 || Kitt Peak || Spacewatch || — || align=right | 2.9 km || 
|-id=383 bgcolor=#d6d6d6
| 226383 ||  || — || July 2, 2003 || Anderson Mesa || LONEOS || EUP || align=right | 6.0 km || 
|-id=384 bgcolor=#fefefe
| 226384 ||  || — || July 22, 2003 || Haleakala || NEAT || H || align=right | 1.2 km || 
|-id=385 bgcolor=#fefefe
| 226385 ||  || — || July 23, 2003 || Socorro || LINEAR || H || align=right data-sort-value="0.96" | 960 m || 
|-id=386 bgcolor=#d6d6d6
| 226386 ||  || — || July 23, 2003 || Palomar || NEAT || — || align=right | 3.3 km || 
|-id=387 bgcolor=#d6d6d6
| 226387 ||  || — || July 30, 2003 || Campo Imperatore || CINEOS || — || align=right | 3.4 km || 
|-id=388 bgcolor=#d6d6d6
| 226388 ||  || — || July 31, 2003 || Reedy Creek || J. Broughton || — || align=right | 5.7 km || 
|-id=389 bgcolor=#fefefe
| 226389 ||  || — || July 22, 2003 || Socorro || LINEAR || H || align=right | 1.1 km || 
|-id=390 bgcolor=#d6d6d6
| 226390 ||  || — || August 1, 2003 || Socorro || LINEAR || — || align=right | 5.2 km || 
|-id=391 bgcolor=#d6d6d6
| 226391 ||  || — || August 2, 2003 || Haleakala || NEAT || — || align=right | 4.5 km || 
|-id=392 bgcolor=#d6d6d6
| 226392 ||  || — || August 18, 2003 || Campo Imperatore || CINEOS || — || align=right | 4.4 km || 
|-id=393 bgcolor=#d6d6d6
| 226393 ||  || — || August 20, 2003 || Palomar || NEAT || — || align=right | 3.3 km || 
|-id=394 bgcolor=#d6d6d6
| 226394 ||  || — || August 19, 2003 || Campo Imperatore || CINEOS || — || align=right | 6.0 km || 
|-id=395 bgcolor=#d6d6d6
| 226395 ||  || — || August 19, 2003 || Campo Imperatore || CINEOS || TEL || align=right | 1.7 km || 
|-id=396 bgcolor=#d6d6d6
| 226396 ||  || — || August 20, 2003 || Palomar || NEAT || — || align=right | 2.8 km || 
|-id=397 bgcolor=#d6d6d6
| 226397 ||  || — || August 20, 2003 || Palomar || NEAT || — || align=right | 3.4 km || 
|-id=398 bgcolor=#d6d6d6
| 226398 ||  || — || August 22, 2003 || Palomar || NEAT || — || align=right | 5.8 km || 
|-id=399 bgcolor=#d6d6d6
| 226399 ||  || — || August 22, 2003 || Palomar || NEAT || — || align=right | 5.2 km || 
|-id=400 bgcolor=#d6d6d6
| 226400 ||  || — || August 22, 2003 || Palomar || NEAT || EUP || align=right | 5.2 km || 
|}

226401–226500 

|-bgcolor=#d6d6d6
| 226401 ||  || — || August 24, 2003 || Socorro || LINEAR || — || align=right | 4.5 km || 
|-id=402 bgcolor=#d6d6d6
| 226402 ||  || — || August 22, 2003 || Palomar || NEAT || URS || align=right | 6.4 km || 
|-id=403 bgcolor=#d6d6d6
| 226403 ||  || — || August 23, 2003 || Palomar || NEAT || — || align=right | 4.8 km || 
|-id=404 bgcolor=#d6d6d6
| 226404 ||  || — || August 23, 2003 || Socorro || LINEAR || MEL || align=right | 5.0 km || 
|-id=405 bgcolor=#d6d6d6
| 226405 ||  || — || August 23, 2003 || Socorro || LINEAR || EOS || align=right | 4.2 km || 
|-id=406 bgcolor=#d6d6d6
| 226406 ||  || — || August 27, 2003 || Palomar || NEAT || EUP || align=right | 7.7 km || 
|-id=407 bgcolor=#d6d6d6
| 226407 ||  || — || August 24, 2003 || Socorro || LINEAR || — || align=right | 4.8 km || 
|-id=408 bgcolor=#d6d6d6
| 226408 ||  || — || August 23, 2003 || Cerro Tololo || M. W. Buie || EOS || align=right | 3.0 km || 
|-id=409 bgcolor=#d6d6d6
| 226409 ||  || — || August 24, 2003 || Cerro Tololo || M. W. Buie || HYG || align=right | 4.6 km || 
|-id=410 bgcolor=#d6d6d6
| 226410 ||  || — || August 27, 2003 || Palomar || NEAT || URS || align=right | 4.4 km || 
|-id=411 bgcolor=#d6d6d6
| 226411 ||  || — || August 28, 2003 || Haleakala || NEAT || — || align=right | 4.1 km || 
|-id=412 bgcolor=#d6d6d6
| 226412 ||  || — || August 29, 2003 || Haleakala || NEAT || — || align=right | 4.2 km || 
|-id=413 bgcolor=#d6d6d6
| 226413 ||  || — || August 28, 2003 || Haleakala || NEAT || EOS || align=right | 3.4 km || 
|-id=414 bgcolor=#d6d6d6
| 226414 ||  || — || August 30, 2003 || Kitt Peak || Spacewatch || LIX || align=right | 6.9 km || 
|-id=415 bgcolor=#d6d6d6
| 226415 ||  || — || August 23, 2003 || Campo Imperatore || CINEOS || — || align=right | 4.5 km || 
|-id=416 bgcolor=#d6d6d6
| 226416 ||  || — || August 27, 2003 || Palomar || NEAT || — || align=right | 6.0 km || 
|-id=417 bgcolor=#d6d6d6
| 226417 ||  || — || September 1, 2003 || Socorro || LINEAR || — || align=right | 4.0 km || 
|-id=418 bgcolor=#d6d6d6
| 226418 ||  || — || September 3, 2003 || Haleakala || NEAT || — || align=right | 4.8 km || 
|-id=419 bgcolor=#d6d6d6
| 226419 ||  || — || September 2, 2003 || Socorro || LINEAR || — || align=right | 2.9 km || 
|-id=420 bgcolor=#d6d6d6
| 226420 ||  || — || September 4, 2003 || Campo Imperatore || CINEOS || ALA || align=right | 4.6 km || 
|-id=421 bgcolor=#d6d6d6
| 226421 ||  || — || September 4, 2003 || Reedy Creek || J. Broughton || — || align=right | 2.9 km || 
|-id=422 bgcolor=#d6d6d6
| 226422 ||  || — || September 2, 2003 || Bergisch Gladbach || W. Bickel || — || align=right | 3.7 km || 
|-id=423 bgcolor=#d6d6d6
| 226423 ||  || — || September 15, 2003 || Haleakala || NEAT || EOS || align=right | 2.7 km || 
|-id=424 bgcolor=#d6d6d6
| 226424 ||  || — || September 13, 2003 || Haleakala || NEAT || — || align=right | 3.4 km || 
|-id=425 bgcolor=#d6d6d6
| 226425 ||  || — || September 16, 2003 || Kitt Peak || Spacewatch || — || align=right | 4.4 km || 
|-id=426 bgcolor=#d6d6d6
| 226426 ||  || — || September 17, 2003 || Kitt Peak || Spacewatch || — || align=right | 4.3 km || 
|-id=427 bgcolor=#d6d6d6
| 226427 ||  || — || September 16, 2003 || Kitt Peak || Spacewatch || — || align=right | 4.0 km || 
|-id=428 bgcolor=#d6d6d6
| 226428 ||  || — || September 16, 2003 || Kitt Peak || Spacewatch || EOS || align=right | 3.1 km || 
|-id=429 bgcolor=#d6d6d6
| 226429 ||  || — || September 16, 2003 || Kitt Peak || Spacewatch || — || align=right | 4.3 km || 
|-id=430 bgcolor=#d6d6d6
| 226430 ||  || — || September 17, 2003 || Haleakala || NEAT || AEG || align=right | 4.6 km || 
|-id=431 bgcolor=#d6d6d6
| 226431 ||  || — || September 17, 2003 || Kitt Peak || Spacewatch || EOS || align=right | 2.5 km || 
|-id=432 bgcolor=#d6d6d6
| 226432 ||  || — || September 17, 2003 || Kitt Peak || Spacewatch || EOS || align=right | 3.1 km || 
|-id=433 bgcolor=#d6d6d6
| 226433 ||  || — || September 18, 2003 || Palomar || NEAT || — || align=right | 3.7 km || 
|-id=434 bgcolor=#d6d6d6
| 226434 ||  || — || September 18, 2003 || Palomar || NEAT || — || align=right | 4.3 km || 
|-id=435 bgcolor=#d6d6d6
| 226435 ||  || — || September 18, 2003 || Palomar || NEAT || HYG || align=right | 5.1 km || 
|-id=436 bgcolor=#d6d6d6
| 226436 ||  || — || September 18, 2003 || Kitt Peak || Spacewatch || — || align=right | 3.6 km || 
|-id=437 bgcolor=#d6d6d6
| 226437 ||  || — || September 16, 2003 || Palomar || NEAT || — || align=right | 4.2 km || 
|-id=438 bgcolor=#d6d6d6
| 226438 ||  || — || September 16, 2003 || Palomar || NEAT || — || align=right | 4.6 km || 
|-id=439 bgcolor=#d6d6d6
| 226439 ||  || — || September 18, 2003 || Palomar || NEAT || — || align=right | 4.1 km || 
|-id=440 bgcolor=#d6d6d6
| 226440 ||  || — || September 18, 2003 || Palomar || NEAT || — || align=right | 5.0 km || 
|-id=441 bgcolor=#d6d6d6
| 226441 ||  || — || September 18, 2003 || Palomar || NEAT || EOS || align=right | 4.1 km || 
|-id=442 bgcolor=#d6d6d6
| 226442 ||  || — || September 18, 2003 || Palomar || NEAT || HYG || align=right | 3.5 km || 
|-id=443 bgcolor=#d6d6d6
| 226443 ||  || — || September 19, 2003 || Palomar || NEAT || — || align=right | 4.8 km || 
|-id=444 bgcolor=#d6d6d6
| 226444 ||  || — || September 18, 2003 || Anderson Mesa || LONEOS || TIR || align=right | 2.8 km || 
|-id=445 bgcolor=#d6d6d6
| 226445 ||  || — || September 18, 2003 || Campo Imperatore || CINEOS || CRO || align=right | 4.2 km || 
|-id=446 bgcolor=#d6d6d6
| 226446 ||  || — || September 18, 2003 || Kitt Peak || Spacewatch || — || align=right | 6.4 km || 
|-id=447 bgcolor=#d6d6d6
| 226447 ||  || — || September 18, 2003 || Kitt Peak || Spacewatch || — || align=right | 3.3 km || 
|-id=448 bgcolor=#d6d6d6
| 226448 ||  || — || September 18, 2003 || Kitt Peak || Spacewatch || HYG || align=right | 4.3 km || 
|-id=449 bgcolor=#d6d6d6
| 226449 ||  || — || September 19, 2003 || Kitt Peak || Spacewatch || — || align=right | 4.5 km || 
|-id=450 bgcolor=#d6d6d6
| 226450 ||  || — || September 19, 2003 || Palomar || NEAT || VER || align=right | 5.3 km || 
|-id=451 bgcolor=#d6d6d6
| 226451 ||  || — || September 19, 2003 || Haleakala || NEAT || — || align=right | 4.3 km || 
|-id=452 bgcolor=#d6d6d6
| 226452 ||  || — || September 19, 2003 || Haleakala || NEAT || — || align=right | 6.1 km || 
|-id=453 bgcolor=#d6d6d6
| 226453 ||  || — || September 20, 2003 || Palomar || NEAT || — || align=right | 4.1 km || 
|-id=454 bgcolor=#d6d6d6
| 226454 ||  || — || September 20, 2003 || Palomar || NEAT || — || align=right | 3.8 km || 
|-id=455 bgcolor=#d6d6d6
| 226455 ||  || — || September 20, 2003 || Haleakala || NEAT || — || align=right | 4.4 km || 
|-id=456 bgcolor=#d6d6d6
| 226456 ||  || — || September 20, 2003 || Palomar || NEAT || — || align=right | 4.7 km || 
|-id=457 bgcolor=#d6d6d6
| 226457 ||  || — || September 19, 2003 || Palomar || NEAT || EUP || align=right | 4.0 km || 
|-id=458 bgcolor=#d6d6d6
| 226458 ||  || — || September 18, 2003 || Palomar || NEAT || EOS || align=right | 3.8 km || 
|-id=459 bgcolor=#d6d6d6
| 226459 ||  || — || September 20, 2003 || Socorro || LINEAR || — || align=right | 5.2 km || 
|-id=460 bgcolor=#d6d6d6
| 226460 ||  || — || September 19, 2003 || Palomar || NEAT || URS || align=right | 5.1 km || 
|-id=461 bgcolor=#d6d6d6
| 226461 ||  || — || September 20, 2003 || Palomar || NEAT || URS || align=right | 5.7 km || 
|-id=462 bgcolor=#d6d6d6
| 226462 ||  || — || September 20, 2003 || Palomar || NEAT || EOS || align=right | 3.3 km || 
|-id=463 bgcolor=#d6d6d6
| 226463 ||  || — || September 21, 2003 || Haleakala || NEAT || URS || align=right | 5.2 km || 
|-id=464 bgcolor=#d6d6d6
| 226464 ||  || — || September 19, 2003 || Haleakala || NEAT || — || align=right | 5.3 km || 
|-id=465 bgcolor=#d6d6d6
| 226465 ||  || — || September 16, 2003 || Kitt Peak || Spacewatch || — || align=right | 5.2 km || 
|-id=466 bgcolor=#d6d6d6
| 226466 ||  || — || September 18, 2003 || Palomar || NEAT || — || align=right | 3.0 km || 
|-id=467 bgcolor=#d6d6d6
| 226467 ||  || — || September 19, 2003 || Anderson Mesa || LONEOS || EOS || align=right | 3.1 km || 
|-id=468 bgcolor=#d6d6d6
| 226468 ||  || — || September 22, 2003 || Palomar || NEAT || HYG || align=right | 5.1 km || 
|-id=469 bgcolor=#d6d6d6
| 226469 ||  || — || September 22, 2003 || Kitt Peak || Spacewatch || — || align=right | 2.6 km || 
|-id=470 bgcolor=#d6d6d6
| 226470 ||  || — || September 23, 2003 || Haleakala || NEAT || — || align=right | 5.0 km || 
|-id=471 bgcolor=#d6d6d6
| 226471 ||  || — || September 18, 2003 || Socorro || LINEAR || HYG || align=right | 5.1 km || 
|-id=472 bgcolor=#d6d6d6
| 226472 ||  || — || September 18, 2003 || Palomar || NEAT || — || align=right | 4.1 km || 
|-id=473 bgcolor=#d6d6d6
| 226473 ||  || — || September 18, 2003 || Kitt Peak || Spacewatch || THM || align=right | 3.8 km || 
|-id=474 bgcolor=#d6d6d6
| 226474 ||  || — || September 18, 2003 || Palomar || NEAT || — || align=right | 3.5 km || 
|-id=475 bgcolor=#d6d6d6
| 226475 ||  || — || September 19, 2003 || Palomar || NEAT || — || align=right | 4.2 km || 
|-id=476 bgcolor=#d6d6d6
| 226476 ||  || — || September 19, 2003 || Palomar || NEAT || HYG || align=right | 3.4 km || 
|-id=477 bgcolor=#d6d6d6
| 226477 ||  || — || September 19, 2003 || Kitt Peak || Spacewatch || — || align=right | 4.6 km || 
|-id=478 bgcolor=#d6d6d6
| 226478 ||  || — || September 21, 2003 || Kitt Peak || Spacewatch || — || align=right | 4.3 km || 
|-id=479 bgcolor=#d6d6d6
| 226479 ||  || — || September 22, 2003 || Anderson Mesa || LONEOS || — || align=right | 5.5 km || 
|-id=480 bgcolor=#d6d6d6
| 226480 ||  || — || September 22, 2003 || Socorro || LINEAR || — || align=right | 5.8 km || 
|-id=481 bgcolor=#d6d6d6
| 226481 ||  || — || September 20, 2003 || Haleakala || NEAT || — || align=right | 3.3 km || 
|-id=482 bgcolor=#d6d6d6
| 226482 ||  || — || September 21, 2003 || Anderson Mesa || LONEOS || THM || align=right | 3.2 km || 
|-id=483 bgcolor=#d6d6d6
| 226483 ||  || — || September 27, 2003 || Socorro || LINEAR || — || align=right | 5.8 km || 
|-id=484 bgcolor=#d6d6d6
| 226484 ||  || — || September 26, 2003 || Socorro || LINEAR || HYG || align=right | 4.8 km || 
|-id=485 bgcolor=#d6d6d6
| 226485 ||  || — || September 27, 2003 || Socorro || LINEAR || — || align=right | 5.4 km || 
|-id=486 bgcolor=#d6d6d6
| 226486 ||  || — || September 27, 2003 || Socorro || LINEAR || HYG || align=right | 3.7 km || 
|-id=487 bgcolor=#d6d6d6
| 226487 ||  || — || September 26, 2003 || Socorro || LINEAR || — || align=right | 3.8 km || 
|-id=488 bgcolor=#d6d6d6
| 226488 ||  || — || September 26, 2003 || Socorro || LINEAR || — || align=right | 5.1 km || 
|-id=489 bgcolor=#d6d6d6
| 226489 ||  || — || September 28, 2003 || Socorro || LINEAR || — || align=right | 6.9 km || 
|-id=490 bgcolor=#d6d6d6
| 226490 ||  || — || September 27, 2003 || Socorro || LINEAR || — || align=right | 4.4 km || 
|-id=491 bgcolor=#d6d6d6
| 226491 ||  || — || September 28, 2003 || Kitt Peak || Spacewatch || HYG || align=right | 4.1 km || 
|-id=492 bgcolor=#d6d6d6
| 226492 ||  || — || September 19, 2003 || Anderson Mesa || LONEOS || — || align=right | 6.3 km || 
|-id=493 bgcolor=#d6d6d6
| 226493 ||  || — || September 20, 2003 || Socorro || LINEAR || — || align=right | 5.3 km || 
|-id=494 bgcolor=#d6d6d6
| 226494 ||  || — || September 20, 2003 || Socorro || LINEAR || EOS || align=right | 3.5 km || 
|-id=495 bgcolor=#d6d6d6
| 226495 ||  || — || September 21, 2003 || Palomar || NEAT || — || align=right | 3.9 km || 
|-id=496 bgcolor=#d6d6d6
| 226496 ||  || — || September 30, 2003 || Socorro || LINEAR || — || align=right | 5.2 km || 
|-id=497 bgcolor=#d6d6d6
| 226497 ||  || — || September 25, 2003 || Palomar || NEAT || ALA || align=right | 6.8 km || 
|-id=498 bgcolor=#d6d6d6
| 226498 ||  || — || September 27, 2003 || Socorro || LINEAR || — || align=right | 4.1 km || 
|-id=499 bgcolor=#d6d6d6
| 226499 ||  || — || September 29, 2003 || Anderson Mesa || LONEOS || — || align=right | 5.5 km || 
|-id=500 bgcolor=#d6d6d6
| 226500 ||  || — || September 27, 2003 || Socorro || LINEAR || HYG || align=right | 4.9 km || 
|}

226501–226600 

|-bgcolor=#d6d6d6
| 226501 ||  || — || September 28, 2003 || Haleakala || NEAT || — || align=right | 3.8 km || 
|-id=502 bgcolor=#d6d6d6
| 226502 ||  || — || September 19, 2003 || Anderson Mesa || LONEOS || — || align=right | 4.6 km || 
|-id=503 bgcolor=#d6d6d6
| 226503 ||  || — || September 20, 2003 || Socorro || LINEAR || — || align=right | 3.6 km || 
|-id=504 bgcolor=#fefefe
| 226504 ||  || — || September 18, 2003 || Kitt Peak || Spacewatch || — || align=right data-sort-value="0.62" | 620 m || 
|-id=505 bgcolor=#d6d6d6
| 226505 ||  || — || September 27, 2003 || Desert Eagle || W. K. Y. Yeung || — || align=right | 4.5 km || 
|-id=506 bgcolor=#d6d6d6
| 226506 ||  || — || September 21, 2003 || Kitt Peak || Spacewatch || — || align=right | 4.6 km || 
|-id=507 bgcolor=#d6d6d6
| 226507 || 2003 TT || — || October 3, 2003 || Kingsnake || J. V. McClusky || — || align=right | 5.7 km || 
|-id=508 bgcolor=#d6d6d6
| 226508 ||  || — || October 15, 2003 || Črni Vrh || Črni Vrh || TIR || align=right | 3.3 km || 
|-id=509 bgcolor=#d6d6d6
| 226509 ||  || — || October 15, 2003 || Anderson Mesa || LONEOS || — || align=right | 4.8 km || 
|-id=510 bgcolor=#d6d6d6
| 226510 ||  || — || October 2, 2003 || Kitt Peak || Spacewatch || HYG || align=right | 4.1 km || 
|-id=511 bgcolor=#d6d6d6
| 226511 ||  || — || October 16, 2003 || Kitt Peak || Spacewatch || — || align=right | 5.6 km || 
|-id=512 bgcolor=#d6d6d6
| 226512 ||  || — || October 20, 2003 || Kingsnake || J. V. McClusky || EOS || align=right | 5.5 km || 
|-id=513 bgcolor=#d6d6d6
| 226513 ||  || — || October 16, 2003 || Goodricke-Pigott || R. A. Tucker || HYG || align=right | 6.4 km || 
|-id=514 bgcolor=#FFC2E0
| 226514 ||  || — || October 26, 2003 || Kitt Peak || Spacewatch || APOPHAmoon || align=right data-sort-value="0.34" | 340 m || 
|-id=515 bgcolor=#d6d6d6
| 226515 ||  || — || October 18, 2003 || Junk Bond || Junk Bond Obs. || THM || align=right | 3.1 km || 
|-id=516 bgcolor=#d6d6d6
| 226516 ||  || — || October 18, 2003 || Kitt Peak || Spacewatch || HYG || align=right | 3.1 km || 
|-id=517 bgcolor=#d6d6d6
| 226517 ||  || — || October 21, 2003 || Goodricke-Pigott || R. A. Tucker || VER || align=right | 6.1 km || 
|-id=518 bgcolor=#d6d6d6
| 226518 ||  || — || October 17, 2003 || Anderson Mesa || LONEOS || TIR || align=right | 4.7 km || 
|-id=519 bgcolor=#d6d6d6
| 226519 ||  || — || October 16, 2003 || Anderson Mesa || LONEOS || HYG || align=right | 5.7 km || 
|-id=520 bgcolor=#d6d6d6
| 226520 ||  || — || October 16, 2003 || Palomar || NEAT || — || align=right | 8.1 km || 
|-id=521 bgcolor=#d6d6d6
| 226521 ||  || — || October 18, 2003 || Palomar || NEAT || — || align=right | 3.8 km || 
|-id=522 bgcolor=#d6d6d6
| 226522 ||  || — || October 19, 2003 || Kitt Peak || Spacewatch || HYG || align=right | 4.3 km || 
|-id=523 bgcolor=#d6d6d6
| 226523 ||  || — || October 17, 2003 || Kitt Peak || Spacewatch || HYG || align=right | 3.5 km || 
|-id=524 bgcolor=#d6d6d6
| 226524 ||  || — || October 19, 2003 || Kitt Peak || Spacewatch || EUP || align=right | 5.8 km || 
|-id=525 bgcolor=#d6d6d6
| 226525 ||  || — || October 19, 2003 || Anderson Mesa || LONEOS || — || align=right | 5.5 km || 
|-id=526 bgcolor=#d6d6d6
| 226526 ||  || — || October 18, 2003 || Kitt Peak || Spacewatch || — || align=right | 3.5 km || 
|-id=527 bgcolor=#d6d6d6
| 226527 ||  || — || October 20, 2003 || Socorro || LINEAR || KOR || align=right | 2.4 km || 
|-id=528 bgcolor=#d6d6d6
| 226528 ||  || — || October 20, 2003 || Socorro || LINEAR || LIX || align=right | 6.0 km || 
|-id=529 bgcolor=#d6d6d6
| 226529 ||  || — || October 16, 2003 || Anderson Mesa || LONEOS || HYG || align=right | 4.7 km || 
|-id=530 bgcolor=#d6d6d6
| 226530 ||  || — || October 18, 2003 || Anderson Mesa || LONEOS || — || align=right | 4.4 km || 
|-id=531 bgcolor=#d6d6d6
| 226531 ||  || — || October 18, 2003 || Anderson Mesa || LONEOS || — || align=right | 5.8 km || 
|-id=532 bgcolor=#d6d6d6
| 226532 ||  || — || October 20, 2003 || Socorro || LINEAR || LIX || align=right | 5.1 km || 
|-id=533 bgcolor=#d6d6d6
| 226533 ||  || — || October 21, 2003 || Kitt Peak || Spacewatch || VER || align=right | 5.4 km || 
|-id=534 bgcolor=#d6d6d6
| 226534 ||  || — || October 21, 2003 || Palomar || NEAT || — || align=right | 3.0 km || 
|-id=535 bgcolor=#d6d6d6
| 226535 ||  || — || October 21, 2003 || Socorro || LINEAR || — || align=right | 7.5 km || 
|-id=536 bgcolor=#d6d6d6
| 226536 ||  || — || October 21, 2003 || Socorro || LINEAR || — || align=right | 4.6 km || 
|-id=537 bgcolor=#d6d6d6
| 226537 ||  || — || October 21, 2003 || Palomar || NEAT || — || align=right | 4.3 km || 
|-id=538 bgcolor=#d6d6d6
| 226538 ||  || — || October 20, 2003 || Kitt Peak || Spacewatch || HYG || align=right | 4.4 km || 
|-id=539 bgcolor=#d6d6d6
| 226539 ||  || — || October 21, 2003 || Socorro || LINEAR || — || align=right | 4.0 km || 
|-id=540 bgcolor=#d6d6d6
| 226540 ||  || — || October 21, 2003 || Socorro || LINEAR || — || align=right | 5.1 km || 
|-id=541 bgcolor=#d6d6d6
| 226541 ||  || — || October 22, 2003 || Kitt Peak || Spacewatch || — || align=right | 4.3 km || 
|-id=542 bgcolor=#d6d6d6
| 226542 ||  || — || October 22, 2003 || Socorro || LINEAR || — || align=right | 3.2 km || 
|-id=543 bgcolor=#d6d6d6
| 226543 ||  || — || October 22, 2003 || Kitt Peak || Spacewatch || EOS || align=right | 2.8 km || 
|-id=544 bgcolor=#d6d6d6
| 226544 ||  || — || October 24, 2003 || Socorro || LINEAR || 7:4 || align=right | 4.2 km || 
|-id=545 bgcolor=#d6d6d6
| 226545 ||  || — || October 21, 2003 || Anderson Mesa || LONEOS || — || align=right | 4.9 km || 
|-id=546 bgcolor=#d6d6d6
| 226546 ||  || — || October 25, 2003 || Socorro || LINEAR || LUT || align=right | 5.7 km || 
|-id=547 bgcolor=#d6d6d6
| 226547 ||  || — || October 27, 2003 || Socorro || LINEAR || LUT || align=right | 5.4 km || 
|-id=548 bgcolor=#d6d6d6
| 226548 ||  || — || October 29, 2003 || Anderson Mesa || LONEOS || — || align=right | 5.6 km || 
|-id=549 bgcolor=#d6d6d6
| 226549 ||  || — || October 17, 2003 || Kitt Peak || Spacewatch || HYG || align=right | 4.9 km || 
|-id=550 bgcolor=#d6d6d6
| 226550 ||  || — || October 18, 2003 || Kitt Peak || Spacewatch || THM || align=right | 2.9 km || 
|-id=551 bgcolor=#d6d6d6
| 226551 ||  || — || October 19, 2003 || Apache Point || SDSS || EOS || align=right | 3.9 km || 
|-id=552 bgcolor=#E9E9E9
| 226552 ||  || — || November 16, 2003 || Kitt Peak || Spacewatch || — || align=right | 3.0 km || 
|-id=553 bgcolor=#d6d6d6
| 226553 ||  || — || November 16, 2003 || Kitt Peak || Spacewatch || — || align=right | 2.9 km || 
|-id=554 bgcolor=#FFC2E0
| 226554 ||  || — || November 20, 2003 || Catalina || CSS || APOPHA || align=right data-sort-value="0.48" | 480 m || 
|-id=555 bgcolor=#d6d6d6
| 226555 ||  || — || November 16, 2003 || Kitt Peak || Spacewatch || — || align=right | 4.7 km || 
|-id=556 bgcolor=#d6d6d6
| 226556 ||  || — || November 18, 2003 || Palomar || NEAT || LIX || align=right | 5.6 km || 
|-id=557 bgcolor=#d6d6d6
| 226557 ||  || — || November 19, 2003 || Socorro || LINEAR || — || align=right | 2.3 km || 
|-id=558 bgcolor=#d6d6d6
| 226558 ||  || — || November 19, 2003 || Socorro || LINEAR || — || align=right | 2.8 km || 
|-id=559 bgcolor=#d6d6d6
| 226559 ||  || — || November 19, 2003 || Socorro || LINEAR || URS || align=right | 5.9 km || 
|-id=560 bgcolor=#d6d6d6
| 226560 ||  || — || November 19, 2003 || Palomar || NEAT || — || align=right | 5.7 km || 
|-id=561 bgcolor=#d6d6d6
| 226561 ||  || — || November 20, 2003 || Kitt Peak || Spacewatch || — || align=right | 6.0 km || 
|-id=562 bgcolor=#d6d6d6
| 226562 ||  || — || November 18, 2003 || Kitt Peak || Spacewatch || HYG || align=right | 4.3 km || 
|-id=563 bgcolor=#d6d6d6
| 226563 ||  || — || November 19, 2003 || Kitt Peak || Spacewatch || — || align=right | 6.6 km || 
|-id=564 bgcolor=#d6d6d6
| 226564 ||  || — || November 20, 2003 || Socorro || LINEAR || EUP || align=right | 5.8 km || 
|-id=565 bgcolor=#d6d6d6
| 226565 ||  || — || November 20, 2003 || Socorro || LINEAR || — || align=right | 4.2 km || 
|-id=566 bgcolor=#d6d6d6
| 226566 ||  || — || November 20, 2003 || Kitt Peak || Spacewatch || — || align=right | 5.3 km || 
|-id=567 bgcolor=#d6d6d6
| 226567 ||  || — || November 23, 2003 || Catalina || CSS || — || align=right | 4.0 km || 
|-id=568 bgcolor=#d6d6d6
| 226568 ||  || — || November 20, 2003 || Palomar || NEAT || — || align=right | 6.1 km || 
|-id=569 bgcolor=#d6d6d6
| 226569 ||  || — || November 24, 2003 || Socorro || LINEAR || — || align=right | 5.1 km || 
|-id=570 bgcolor=#d6d6d6
| 226570 ||  || — || November 16, 2003 || Apache Point || SDSS || — || align=right | 3.9 km || 
|-id=571 bgcolor=#d6d6d6
| 226571 ||  || — || December 4, 2003 || Socorro || LINEAR || MEL || align=right | 5.6 km || 
|-id=572 bgcolor=#d6d6d6
| 226572 ||  || — || December 12, 2003 || Palomar || NEAT || — || align=right | 7.3 km || 
|-id=573 bgcolor=#d6d6d6
| 226573 ||  || — || December 14, 2003 || Palomar || NEAT || ULA7:4 || align=right | 7.2 km || 
|-id=574 bgcolor=#fefefe
| 226574 ||  || — || December 18, 2003 || Socorro || LINEAR || H || align=right | 1.2 km || 
|-id=575 bgcolor=#fefefe
| 226575 ||  || — || December 17, 2003 || Kitt Peak || Spacewatch || — || align=right | 1.1 km || 
|-id=576 bgcolor=#d6d6d6
| 226576 ||  || — || December 18, 2003 || Socorro || LINEAR || — || align=right | 4.6 km || 
|-id=577 bgcolor=#d6d6d6
| 226577 ||  || — || December 19, 2003 || Kitt Peak || Spacewatch || HYG || align=right | 4.4 km || 
|-id=578 bgcolor=#d6d6d6
| 226578 ||  || — || December 19, 2003 || Kitt Peak || Spacewatch || — || align=right | 4.4 km || 
|-id=579 bgcolor=#fefefe
| 226579 ||  || — || December 19, 2003 || Socorro || LINEAR || — || align=right | 1.3 km || 
|-id=580 bgcolor=#fefefe
| 226580 ||  || — || December 21, 2003 || Kitt Peak || Spacewatch || V || align=right data-sort-value="0.97" | 970 m || 
|-id=581 bgcolor=#d6d6d6
| 226581 ||  || — || December 28, 2003 || Socorro || LINEAR || — || align=right | 7.2 km || 
|-id=582 bgcolor=#fefefe
| 226582 ||  || — || December 29, 2003 || Socorro || LINEAR || H || align=right | 1.4 km || 
|-id=583 bgcolor=#d6d6d6
| 226583 ||  || — || December 17, 2003 || Kitt Peak || Spacewatch || — || align=right | 5.6 km || 
|-id=584 bgcolor=#fefefe
| 226584 ||  || — || January 13, 2004 || Anderson Mesa || LONEOS || — || align=right | 1.1 km || 
|-id=585 bgcolor=#fefefe
| 226585 ||  || — || January 13, 2004 || Kitt Peak || Spacewatch || FLO || align=right data-sort-value="0.61" | 610 m || 
|-id=586 bgcolor=#fefefe
| 226586 ||  || — || January 16, 2004 || Kitt Peak || Spacewatch || — || align=right data-sort-value="0.77" | 770 m || 
|-id=587 bgcolor=#d6d6d6
| 226587 ||  || — || January 18, 2004 || Kitt Peak || Spacewatch || — || align=right | 3.9 km || 
|-id=588 bgcolor=#fefefe
| 226588 ||  || — || January 18, 2004 || Palomar || NEAT || — || align=right | 1.2 km || 
|-id=589 bgcolor=#fefefe
| 226589 ||  || — || January 18, 2004 || Palomar || NEAT || — || align=right data-sort-value="0.92" | 920 m || 
|-id=590 bgcolor=#d6d6d6
| 226590 ||  || — || January 21, 2004 || Socorro || LINEAR || — || align=right | 4.4 km || 
|-id=591 bgcolor=#fefefe
| 226591 ||  || — || January 22, 2004 || Socorro || LINEAR || V || align=right data-sort-value="0.97" | 970 m || 
|-id=592 bgcolor=#fefefe
| 226592 ||  || — || January 29, 2004 || Kitt Peak || Spacewatch || FLO || align=right | 1.3 km || 
|-id=593 bgcolor=#d6d6d6
| 226593 ||  || — || February 12, 2004 || Kitt Peak || Spacewatch || — || align=right | 6.4 km || 
|-id=594 bgcolor=#fefefe
| 226594 ||  || — || February 12, 2004 || Kitt Peak || Spacewatch || — || align=right | 1.8 km || 
|-id=595 bgcolor=#fefefe
| 226595 ||  || — || February 11, 2004 || Catalina || CSS || — || align=right | 1.4 km || 
|-id=596 bgcolor=#fefefe
| 226596 ||  || — || February 12, 2004 || Kitt Peak || Spacewatch || — || align=right | 1.0 km || 
|-id=597 bgcolor=#fefefe
| 226597 ||  || — || February 12, 2004 || Palomar || NEAT || — || align=right | 1.2 km || 
|-id=598 bgcolor=#fefefe
| 226598 ||  || — || February 11, 2004 || Palomar || NEAT || FLO || align=right data-sort-value="0.89" | 890 m || 
|-id=599 bgcolor=#fefefe
| 226599 ||  || — || February 14, 2004 || Haleakala || NEAT || FLO || align=right | 1.2 km || 
|-id=600 bgcolor=#fefefe
| 226600 ||  || — || February 13, 2004 || Palomar || NEAT || — || align=right | 1.6 km || 
|}

226601–226700 

|-bgcolor=#fefefe
| 226601 ||  || — || February 11, 2004 || Palomar || NEAT || — || align=right | 1.2 km || 
|-id=602 bgcolor=#d6d6d6
| 226602 ||  || — || February 13, 2004 || Kitt Peak || Spacewatch || 3:2 || align=right | 5.8 km || 
|-id=603 bgcolor=#fefefe
| 226603 ||  || — || February 13, 2004 || Kitt Peak || Spacewatch || FLO || align=right data-sort-value="0.91" | 910 m || 
|-id=604 bgcolor=#fefefe
| 226604 ||  || — || February 14, 2004 || Kitt Peak || Spacewatch || — || align=right | 1.1 km || 
|-id=605 bgcolor=#fefefe
| 226605 ||  || — || February 13, 2004 || Palomar || NEAT || — || align=right | 1.9 km || 
|-id=606 bgcolor=#fefefe
| 226606 ||  || — || February 10, 2004 || Palomar || NEAT || — || align=right | 1.2 km || 
|-id=607 bgcolor=#fefefe
| 226607 ||  || — || February 16, 2004 || Kitt Peak || Spacewatch || NYS || align=right | 1.0 km || 
|-id=608 bgcolor=#fefefe
| 226608 ||  || — || February 17, 2004 || Catalina || CSS || FLO || align=right | 1.2 km || 
|-id=609 bgcolor=#fefefe
| 226609 ||  || — || February 17, 2004 || Catalina || CSS || FLO || align=right data-sort-value="0.86" | 860 m || 
|-id=610 bgcolor=#fefefe
| 226610 ||  || — || February 18, 2004 || Socorro || LINEAR || — || align=right | 1.2 km || 
|-id=611 bgcolor=#fefefe
| 226611 ||  || — || February 19, 2004 || Socorro || LINEAR || — || align=right | 1.5 km || 
|-id=612 bgcolor=#d6d6d6
| 226612 ||  || — || February 17, 2004 || Kitt Peak || Spacewatch || SHU3:2 || align=right | 9.1 km || 
|-id=613 bgcolor=#fefefe
| 226613 ||  || — || February 17, 2004 || Socorro || LINEAR || — || align=right | 1.2 km || 
|-id=614 bgcolor=#fefefe
| 226614 ||  || — || February 17, 2004 || Kitt Peak || Spacewatch || — || align=right | 1.2 km || 
|-id=615 bgcolor=#fefefe
| 226615 ||  || — || February 23, 2004 || Socorro || LINEAR || — || align=right | 1.1 km || 
|-id=616 bgcolor=#fefefe
| 226616 ||  || — || February 23, 2004 || Socorro || LINEAR || — || align=right | 1.3 km || 
|-id=617 bgcolor=#fefefe
| 226617 ||  || — || February 19, 2004 || Socorro || LINEAR || — || align=right | 1.4 km || 
|-id=618 bgcolor=#fefefe
| 226618 ||  || — || February 22, 2004 || Kitt Peak || Spacewatch || — || align=right | 1.4 km || 
|-id=619 bgcolor=#fefefe
| 226619 ||  || — || February 17, 2004 || Socorro || LINEAR || FLO || align=right data-sort-value="0.92" | 920 m || 
|-id=620 bgcolor=#fefefe
| 226620 ||  || — || March 11, 2004 || Palomar || NEAT || NYS || align=right | 2.2 km || 
|-id=621 bgcolor=#fefefe
| 226621 ||  || — || March 12, 2004 || Palomar || NEAT || — || align=right | 1.2 km || 
|-id=622 bgcolor=#fefefe
| 226622 ||  || — || March 12, 2004 || Palomar || NEAT || V || align=right | 1.1 km || 
|-id=623 bgcolor=#fefefe
| 226623 ||  || — || March 13, 2004 || Palomar || NEAT || — || align=right | 2.4 km || 
|-id=624 bgcolor=#fefefe
| 226624 ||  || — || March 15, 2004 || Kitt Peak || Spacewatch || — || align=right data-sort-value="0.97" | 970 m || 
|-id=625 bgcolor=#fefefe
| 226625 ||  || — || March 13, 2004 || Palomar || NEAT || — || align=right | 1.1 km || 
|-id=626 bgcolor=#fefefe
| 226626 ||  || — || March 15, 2004 || Socorro || LINEAR || — || align=right | 1.4 km || 
|-id=627 bgcolor=#fefefe
| 226627 ||  || — || March 15, 2004 || Catalina || CSS || FLO || align=right | 1.4 km || 
|-id=628 bgcolor=#fefefe
| 226628 ||  || — || March 15, 2004 || Socorro || LINEAR || — || align=right data-sort-value="0.97" | 970 m || 
|-id=629 bgcolor=#fefefe
| 226629 ||  || — || March 15, 2004 || Catalina || CSS || — || align=right data-sort-value="0.79" | 790 m || 
|-id=630 bgcolor=#fefefe
| 226630 ||  || — || March 15, 2004 || Kitt Peak || Spacewatch || — || align=right data-sort-value="0.89" | 890 m || 
|-id=631 bgcolor=#fefefe
| 226631 ||  || — || March 17, 2004 || Goodricke-Pigott || R. A. Tucker || — || align=right | 1.2 km || 
|-id=632 bgcolor=#fefefe
| 226632 ||  || — || March 18, 2004 || Socorro || LINEAR || — || align=right | 1.0 km || 
|-id=633 bgcolor=#fefefe
| 226633 ||  || — || March 16, 2004 || Catalina || CSS || FLO || align=right data-sort-value="0.95" | 950 m || 
|-id=634 bgcolor=#E9E9E9
| 226634 ||  || — || March 16, 2004 || Catalina || CSS || — || align=right | 2.5 km || 
|-id=635 bgcolor=#fefefe
| 226635 ||  || — || March 16, 2004 || Catalina || CSS || FLO || align=right data-sort-value="0.95" | 950 m || 
|-id=636 bgcolor=#fefefe
| 226636 ||  || — || March 16, 2004 || Kitt Peak || Spacewatch || — || align=right | 1.2 km || 
|-id=637 bgcolor=#fefefe
| 226637 ||  || — || March 16, 2004 || Kitt Peak || Spacewatch || — || align=right | 1.1 km || 
|-id=638 bgcolor=#fefefe
| 226638 ||  || — || March 16, 2004 || Socorro || LINEAR || — || align=right | 1.5 km || 
|-id=639 bgcolor=#fefefe
| 226639 ||  || — || March 16, 2004 || Socorro || LINEAR || — || align=right | 1.1 km || 
|-id=640 bgcolor=#fefefe
| 226640 ||  || — || March 18, 2004 || Socorro || LINEAR || FLO || align=right data-sort-value="0.85" | 850 m || 
|-id=641 bgcolor=#fefefe
| 226641 ||  || — || March 19, 2004 || Socorro || LINEAR || — || align=right | 1.1 km || 
|-id=642 bgcolor=#fefefe
| 226642 ||  || — || March 19, 2004 || Socorro || LINEAR || V || align=right | 1.1 km || 
|-id=643 bgcolor=#fefefe
| 226643 ||  || — || March 20, 2004 || Socorro || LINEAR || FLO || align=right | 1.2 km || 
|-id=644 bgcolor=#E9E9E9
| 226644 ||  || — || March 16, 2004 || Kitt Peak || Spacewatch || — || align=right | 1.4 km || 
|-id=645 bgcolor=#fefefe
| 226645 ||  || — || March 19, 2004 || Kitt Peak || Spacewatch || FLO || align=right data-sort-value="0.75" | 750 m || 
|-id=646 bgcolor=#fefefe
| 226646 ||  || — || March 18, 2004 || Kitt Peak || Spacewatch || V || align=right data-sort-value="0.95" | 950 m || 
|-id=647 bgcolor=#fefefe
| 226647 ||  || — || March 18, 2004 || Socorro || LINEAR || — || align=right data-sort-value="0.78" | 780 m || 
|-id=648 bgcolor=#fefefe
| 226648 ||  || — || March 20, 2004 || Socorro || LINEAR || V || align=right | 1.2 km || 
|-id=649 bgcolor=#fefefe
| 226649 ||  || — || March 20, 2004 || Socorro || LINEAR || NYS || align=right data-sort-value="0.76" | 760 m || 
|-id=650 bgcolor=#fefefe
| 226650 ||  || — || March 20, 2004 || Socorro || LINEAR || FLO || align=right data-sort-value="0.90" | 900 m || 
|-id=651 bgcolor=#fefefe
| 226651 ||  || — || March 22, 2004 || Socorro || LINEAR || — || align=right | 1.3 km || 
|-id=652 bgcolor=#fefefe
| 226652 ||  || — || March 25, 2004 || Anderson Mesa || LONEOS || ERI || align=right | 3.0 km || 
|-id=653 bgcolor=#fefefe
| 226653 ||  || — || March 27, 2004 || Catalina || CSS || NYS || align=right | 2.2 km || 
|-id=654 bgcolor=#fefefe
| 226654 ||  || — || March 26, 2004 || Socorro || LINEAR || ERI || align=right | 2.3 km || 
|-id=655 bgcolor=#fefefe
| 226655 ||  || — || March 27, 2004 || Socorro || LINEAR || — || align=right data-sort-value="0.95" | 950 m || 
|-id=656 bgcolor=#fefefe
| 226656 ||  || — || March 26, 2004 || Anderson Mesa || LONEOS || V || align=right | 1.3 km || 
|-id=657 bgcolor=#fefefe
| 226657 ||  || — || March 27, 2004 || Socorro || LINEAR || NYS || align=right data-sort-value="0.90" | 900 m || 
|-id=658 bgcolor=#fefefe
| 226658 ||  || — || March 27, 2004 || Socorro || LINEAR || FLO || align=right data-sort-value="0.87" | 870 m || 
|-id=659 bgcolor=#fefefe
| 226659 ||  || — || March 18, 2004 || Kitt Peak || Spacewatch || V || align=right data-sort-value="0.74" | 740 m || 
|-id=660 bgcolor=#fefefe
| 226660 ||  || — || April 11, 2004 || Palomar || NEAT || V || align=right | 1.1 km || 
|-id=661 bgcolor=#fefefe
| 226661 ||  || — || April 12, 2004 || Catalina || CSS || — || align=right | 3.8 km || 
|-id=662 bgcolor=#fefefe
| 226662 ||  || — || April 13, 2004 || Palomar || NEAT || V || align=right data-sort-value="0.94" | 940 m || 
|-id=663 bgcolor=#fefefe
| 226663 ||  || — || April 13, 2004 || Palomar || NEAT || V || align=right | 1.2 km || 
|-id=664 bgcolor=#fefefe
| 226664 ||  || — || April 11, 2004 || Catalina || CSS || NYS || align=right data-sort-value="0.80" | 800 m || 
|-id=665 bgcolor=#fefefe
| 226665 ||  || — || April 12, 2004 || Palomar || NEAT || NYS || align=right data-sort-value="0.84" | 840 m || 
|-id=666 bgcolor=#fefefe
| 226666 ||  || — || April 12, 2004 || Palomar || NEAT || — || align=right | 3.5 km || 
|-id=667 bgcolor=#fefefe
| 226667 ||  || — || April 13, 2004 || Palomar || NEAT || KLI || align=right | 3.6 km || 
|-id=668 bgcolor=#fefefe
| 226668 ||  || — || April 12, 2004 || Kitt Peak || Spacewatch || NYS || align=right data-sort-value="0.93" | 930 m || 
|-id=669 bgcolor=#fefefe
| 226669 ||  || — || April 12, 2004 || Kitt Peak || Spacewatch || — || align=right data-sort-value="0.90" | 900 m || 
|-id=670 bgcolor=#fefefe
| 226670 ||  || — || April 13, 2004 || Kitt Peak || Spacewatch || — || align=right data-sort-value="0.90" | 900 m || 
|-id=671 bgcolor=#fefefe
| 226671 ||  || — || April 12, 2004 || Kitt Peak || Spacewatch || — || align=right data-sort-value="0.74" | 740 m || 
|-id=672 bgcolor=#fefefe
| 226672 Kucinskas ||  ||  || April 16, 2004 || Moletai || K. Černis, J. Zdanavičius || — || align=right | 1.9 km || 
|-id=673 bgcolor=#fefefe
| 226673 ||  || — || April 17, 2004 || Socorro || LINEAR || — || align=right data-sort-value="0.92" | 920 m || 
|-id=674 bgcolor=#fefefe
| 226674 ||  || — || April 16, 2004 || Kitt Peak || Spacewatch || — || align=right data-sort-value="0.94" | 940 m || 
|-id=675 bgcolor=#fefefe
| 226675 ||  || — || April 17, 2004 || Socorro || LINEAR || — || align=right | 1.4 km || 
|-id=676 bgcolor=#fefefe
| 226676 ||  || — || April 20, 2004 || Socorro || LINEAR || FLO || align=right data-sort-value="0.98" | 980 m || 
|-id=677 bgcolor=#fefefe
| 226677 ||  || — || April 20, 2004 || Socorro || LINEAR || — || align=right data-sort-value="0.95" | 950 m || 
|-id=678 bgcolor=#fefefe
| 226678 ||  || — || April 17, 2004 || Socorro || LINEAR || V || align=right data-sort-value="0.93" | 930 m || 
|-id=679 bgcolor=#fefefe
| 226679 ||  || — || April 20, 2004 || Socorro || LINEAR || NYS || align=right data-sort-value="0.97" | 970 m || 
|-id=680 bgcolor=#fefefe
| 226680 ||  || — || April 20, 2004 || Socorro || LINEAR || PHO || align=right | 1.7 km || 
|-id=681 bgcolor=#fefefe
| 226681 ||  || — || April 20, 2004 || Siding Spring || SSS || — || align=right | 1.3 km || 
|-id=682 bgcolor=#fefefe
| 226682 ||  || — || April 21, 2004 || Kitt Peak || Spacewatch || — || align=right data-sort-value="0.94" | 940 m || 
|-id=683 bgcolor=#fefefe
| 226683 ||  || — || April 23, 2004 || Siding Spring || SSS || — || align=right | 1.3 km || 
|-id=684 bgcolor=#fefefe
| 226684 ||  || — || April 24, 2004 || Kitt Peak || Spacewatch || V || align=right data-sort-value="0.85" | 850 m || 
|-id=685 bgcolor=#fefefe
| 226685 ||  || — || April 21, 2004 || Socorro || LINEAR || NYS || align=right data-sort-value="0.87" | 870 m || 
|-id=686 bgcolor=#fefefe
| 226686 ||  || — || April 21, 2004 || Kitt Peak || Spacewatch || V || align=right | 1.0 km || 
|-id=687 bgcolor=#fefefe
| 226687 ||  || — || May 9, 2004 || Palomar || NEAT || — || align=right | 1.2 km || 
|-id=688 bgcolor=#fefefe
| 226688 ||  || — || May 10, 2004 || Palomar || NEAT || NYS || align=right data-sort-value="0.96" | 960 m || 
|-id=689 bgcolor=#fefefe
| 226689 ||  || — || May 13, 2004 || Palomar || NEAT || V || align=right | 1.0 km || 
|-id=690 bgcolor=#E9E9E9
| 226690 ||  || — || May 14, 2004 || Socorro || LINEAR || — || align=right | 1.3 km || 
|-id=691 bgcolor=#C2FFFF
| 226691 ||  || — || May 9, 2004 || Kitt Peak || Spacewatch || L4 || align=right | 13 km || 
|-id=692 bgcolor=#fefefe
| 226692 ||  || — || May 15, 2004 || Socorro || LINEAR || NYS || align=right | 1.0 km || 
|-id=693 bgcolor=#fefefe
| 226693 ||  || — || May 15, 2004 || Socorro || LINEAR || — || align=right | 1.0 km || 
|-id=694 bgcolor=#fefefe
| 226694 ||  || — || May 15, 2004 || Socorro || LINEAR || NYS || align=right data-sort-value="0.88" | 880 m || 
|-id=695 bgcolor=#E9E9E9
| 226695 ||  || — || May 15, 2004 || Socorro || LINEAR || — || align=right | 1.2 km || 
|-id=696 bgcolor=#fefefe
| 226696 ||  || — || May 15, 2004 || Siding Spring || SSS || — || align=right | 1.3 km || 
|-id=697 bgcolor=#E9E9E9
| 226697 ||  || — || May 10, 2004 || Catalina || CSS || — || align=right | 1.5 km || 
|-id=698 bgcolor=#fefefe
| 226698 ||  || — || June 12, 2004 || Siding Spring || SSS || — || align=right | 1.5 km || 
|-id=699 bgcolor=#E9E9E9
| 226699 ||  || — || June 14, 2004 || Socorro || LINEAR || JUN || align=right | 1.9 km || 
|-id=700 bgcolor=#E9E9E9
| 226700 ||  || — || June 14, 2004 || Socorro || LINEAR || RAF || align=right | 1.6 km || 
|}

226701–226800 

|-bgcolor=#fefefe
| 226701 ||  || — || July 12, 2004 || Reedy Creek || J. Broughton || NYS || align=right data-sort-value="0.86" | 860 m || 
|-id=702 bgcolor=#E9E9E9
| 226702 ||  || — || July 11, 2004 || Socorro || LINEAR || — || align=right | 3.9 km || 
|-id=703 bgcolor=#E9E9E9
| 226703 ||  || — || July 9, 2004 || Socorro || LINEAR || — || align=right | 3.5 km || 
|-id=704 bgcolor=#E9E9E9
| 226704 ||  || — || July 11, 2004 || Socorro || LINEAR || — || align=right | 3.8 km || 
|-id=705 bgcolor=#E9E9E9
| 226705 ||  || — || July 14, 2004 || Socorro || LINEAR || — || align=right | 1.8 km || 
|-id=706 bgcolor=#E9E9E9
| 226706 ||  || — || July 14, 2004 || Socorro || LINEAR || — || align=right | 3.5 km || 
|-id=707 bgcolor=#E9E9E9
| 226707 ||  || — || July 16, 2004 || Socorro || LINEAR || — || align=right | 1.2 km || 
|-id=708 bgcolor=#E9E9E9
| 226708 ||  || — || July 16, 2004 || Socorro || LINEAR || — || align=right | 3.7 km || 
|-id=709 bgcolor=#E9E9E9
| 226709 ||  || — || July 16, 2004 || Socorro || LINEAR || — || align=right | 2.1 km || 
|-id=710 bgcolor=#E9E9E9
| 226710 ||  || — || July 25, 2004 || Anderson Mesa || LONEOS || INO || align=right | 2.6 km || 
|-id=711 bgcolor=#E9E9E9
| 226711 ||  || — || July 27, 2004 || Siding Spring || SSS || — || align=right | 2.2 km || 
|-id=712 bgcolor=#E9E9E9
| 226712 ||  || — || August 6, 2004 || Reedy Creek || J. Broughton || — || align=right | 1.4 km || 
|-id=713 bgcolor=#E9E9E9
| 226713 ||  || — || August 5, 2004 || Palomar || NEAT || — || align=right | 2.1 km || 
|-id=714 bgcolor=#E9E9E9
| 226714 ||  || — || August 7, 2004 || Palomar || NEAT || — || align=right | 2.2 km || 
|-id=715 bgcolor=#E9E9E9
| 226715 ||  || — || August 7, 2004 || Palomar || NEAT || — || align=right | 2.6 km || 
|-id=716 bgcolor=#E9E9E9
| 226716 ||  || — || August 8, 2004 || Anderson Mesa || LONEOS || — || align=right | 2.7 km || 
|-id=717 bgcolor=#E9E9E9
| 226717 ||  || — || August 8, 2004 || Socorro || LINEAR || — || align=right | 3.3 km || 
|-id=718 bgcolor=#E9E9E9
| 226718 ||  || — || August 8, 2004 || Socorro || LINEAR || — || align=right | 2.9 km || 
|-id=719 bgcolor=#E9E9E9
| 226719 ||  || — || August 8, 2004 || Anderson Mesa || LONEOS || INO || align=right | 1.4 km || 
|-id=720 bgcolor=#E9E9E9
| 226720 ||  || — || August 9, 2004 || Socorro || LINEAR || — || align=right | 2.2 km || 
|-id=721 bgcolor=#E9E9E9
| 226721 ||  || — || August 9, 2004 || Anderson Mesa || LONEOS || — || align=right | 3.3 km || 
|-id=722 bgcolor=#E9E9E9
| 226722 ||  || — || August 8, 2004 || Socorro || LINEAR || MIS || align=right | 3.7 km || 
|-id=723 bgcolor=#E9E9E9
| 226723 ||  || — || August 8, 2004 || Palomar || NEAT || NEM || align=right | 3.1 km || 
|-id=724 bgcolor=#E9E9E9
| 226724 ||  || — || August 9, 2004 || Siding Spring || SSS || — || align=right | 2.5 km || 
|-id=725 bgcolor=#E9E9E9
| 226725 ||  || — || August 10, 2004 || Socorro || LINEAR || — || align=right | 4.0 km || 
|-id=726 bgcolor=#E9E9E9
| 226726 ||  || — || August 6, 2004 || Palomar || NEAT || — || align=right | 3.5 km || 
|-id=727 bgcolor=#E9E9E9
| 226727 ||  || — || August 9, 2004 || Socorro || LINEAR || ADE || align=right | 4.5 km || 
|-id=728 bgcolor=#E9E9E9
| 226728 ||  || — || August 12, 2004 || Palomar || NEAT || MAR || align=right | 1.7 km || 
|-id=729 bgcolor=#E9E9E9
| 226729 ||  || — || August 12, 2004 || Palomar || NEAT || — || align=right | 1.9 km || 
|-id=730 bgcolor=#E9E9E9
| 226730 ||  || — || August 11, 2004 || Reedy Creek || J. Broughton || — || align=right | 3.9 km || 
|-id=731 bgcolor=#E9E9E9
| 226731 ||  || — || August 8, 2004 || Socorro || LINEAR || — || align=right | 3.5 km || 
|-id=732 bgcolor=#E9E9E9
| 226732 ||  || — || August 8, 2004 || Socorro || LINEAR || — || align=right | 2.6 km || 
|-id=733 bgcolor=#E9E9E9
| 226733 ||  || — || August 11, 2004 || Siding Spring || SSS || — || align=right | 2.1 km || 
|-id=734 bgcolor=#E9E9E9
| 226734 ||  || — || August 6, 2004 || Palomar || NEAT || — || align=right | 4.2 km || 
|-id=735 bgcolor=#E9E9E9
| 226735 ||  || — || August 21, 2004 || Siding Spring || SSS || — || align=right | 3.2 km || 
|-id=736 bgcolor=#E9E9E9
| 226736 ||  || — || August 21, 2004 || Siding Spring || SSS || — || align=right | 3.9 km || 
|-id=737 bgcolor=#E9E9E9
| 226737 ||  || — || August 23, 2004 || Kitt Peak || Spacewatch || AGN || align=right | 1.4 km || 
|-id=738 bgcolor=#E9E9E9
| 226738 ||  || — || September 6, 2004 || Socorro || LINEAR || — || align=right | 4.7 km || 
|-id=739 bgcolor=#E9E9E9
| 226739 ||  || — || September 6, 2004 || Socorro || LINEAR || HNS || align=right | 2.5 km || 
|-id=740 bgcolor=#E9E9E9
| 226740 ||  || — || September 4, 2004 || Palomar || NEAT || — || align=right | 3.4 km || 
|-id=741 bgcolor=#E9E9E9
| 226741 ||  || — || September 4, 2004 || Palomar || NEAT || — || align=right | 2.8 km || 
|-id=742 bgcolor=#E9E9E9
| 226742 ||  || — || September 6, 2004 || Siding Spring || SSS || — || align=right | 3.0 km || 
|-id=743 bgcolor=#E9E9E9
| 226743 ||  || — || September 7, 2004 || Socorro || LINEAR || — || align=right | 3.2 km || 
|-id=744 bgcolor=#E9E9E9
| 226744 ||  || — || September 7, 2004 || Goodricke-Pigott || Goodricke-Pigott Obs. || — || align=right | 2.3 km || 
|-id=745 bgcolor=#E9E9E9
| 226745 ||  || — || September 7, 2004 || Kitt Peak || Spacewatch || — || align=right | 2.2 km || 
|-id=746 bgcolor=#d6d6d6
| 226746 ||  || — || September 7, 2004 || Kitt Peak || Spacewatch || SAN || align=right | 2.4 km || 
|-id=747 bgcolor=#E9E9E9
| 226747 ||  || — || September 7, 2004 || Socorro || LINEAR || — || align=right | 2.1 km || 
|-id=748 bgcolor=#E9E9E9
| 226748 ||  || — || September 6, 2004 || Palomar || NEAT || — || align=right | 2.0 km || 
|-id=749 bgcolor=#E9E9E9
| 226749 ||  || — || September 6, 2004 || Siding Spring || SSS || — || align=right | 2.4 km || 
|-id=750 bgcolor=#E9E9E9
| 226750 ||  || — || September 6, 2004 || Siding Spring || SSS || PAE || align=right | 3.1 km || 
|-id=751 bgcolor=#E9E9E9
| 226751 ||  || — || September 6, 2004 || Siding Spring || SSS || AEO || align=right | 2.4 km || 
|-id=752 bgcolor=#E9E9E9
| 226752 ||  || — || September 7, 2004 || Socorro || LINEAR || GEF || align=right | 2.2 km || 
|-id=753 bgcolor=#E9E9E9
| 226753 ||  || — || September 8, 2004 || Socorro || LINEAR || NEM || align=right | 2.3 km || 
|-id=754 bgcolor=#E9E9E9
| 226754 ||  || — || September 8, 2004 || Socorro || LINEAR || — || align=right | 2.8 km || 
|-id=755 bgcolor=#E9E9E9
| 226755 ||  || — || September 8, 2004 || Socorro || LINEAR || HEN || align=right | 1.4 km || 
|-id=756 bgcolor=#E9E9E9
| 226756 ||  || — || September 8, 2004 || Socorro || LINEAR || — || align=right | 2.2 km || 
|-id=757 bgcolor=#E9E9E9
| 226757 ||  || — || September 8, 2004 || Socorro || LINEAR || HNA || align=right | 3.1 km || 
|-id=758 bgcolor=#E9E9E9
| 226758 ||  || — || September 8, 2004 || Socorro || LINEAR || NEM || align=right | 2.9 km || 
|-id=759 bgcolor=#E9E9E9
| 226759 ||  || — || September 8, 2004 || Socorro || LINEAR || AGN || align=right | 1.5 km || 
|-id=760 bgcolor=#E9E9E9
| 226760 ||  || — || September 8, 2004 || Socorro || LINEAR || ADE || align=right | 4.7 km || 
|-id=761 bgcolor=#E9E9E9
| 226761 ||  || — || September 8, 2004 || Socorro || LINEAR || — || align=right | 1.9 km || 
|-id=762 bgcolor=#E9E9E9
| 226762 ||  || — || September 8, 2004 || Socorro || LINEAR || — || align=right | 3.2 km || 
|-id=763 bgcolor=#E9E9E9
| 226763 ||  || — || September 8, 2004 || Socorro || LINEAR || — || align=right | 2.8 km || 
|-id=764 bgcolor=#E9E9E9
| 226764 ||  || — || September 7, 2004 || Kitt Peak || Spacewatch || — || align=right | 1.8 km || 
|-id=765 bgcolor=#E9E9E9
| 226765 ||  || — || September 8, 2004 || Socorro || LINEAR || GEF || align=right | 2.3 km || 
|-id=766 bgcolor=#E9E9E9
| 226766 ||  || — || September 8, 2004 || Socorro || LINEAR || — || align=right | 3.0 km || 
|-id=767 bgcolor=#E9E9E9
| 226767 ||  || — || September 8, 2004 || Socorro || LINEAR || — || align=right | 2.3 km || 
|-id=768 bgcolor=#E9E9E9
| 226768 ||  || — || September 9, 2004 || Socorro || LINEAR || GEF || align=right | 2.0 km || 
|-id=769 bgcolor=#E9E9E9
| 226769 ||  || — || September 7, 2004 || Kitt Peak || Spacewatch || AEO || align=right | 1.5 km || 
|-id=770 bgcolor=#E9E9E9
| 226770 ||  || — || September 7, 2004 || Kitt Peak || Spacewatch || AGN || align=right | 1.4 km || 
|-id=771 bgcolor=#E9E9E9
| 226771 ||  || — || September 7, 2004 || Socorro || LINEAR || HOF || align=right | 5.0 km || 
|-id=772 bgcolor=#E9E9E9
| 226772 ||  || — || September 7, 2004 || Kitt Peak || Spacewatch || — || align=right | 1.6 km || 
|-id=773 bgcolor=#E9E9E9
| 226773 ||  || — || September 7, 2004 || Kitt Peak || Spacewatch || — || align=right | 3.5 km || 
|-id=774 bgcolor=#E9E9E9
| 226774 ||  || — || September 7, 2004 || Kitt Peak || Spacewatch || PAD || align=right | 1.7 km || 
|-id=775 bgcolor=#E9E9E9
| 226775 ||  || — || September 7, 2004 || Kitt Peak || Spacewatch || — || align=right | 2.4 km || 
|-id=776 bgcolor=#E9E9E9
| 226776 ||  || — || September 8, 2004 || Palomar || NEAT || — || align=right | 3.6 km || 
|-id=777 bgcolor=#E9E9E9
| 226777 ||  || — || September 8, 2004 || Socorro || LINEAR || PAD || align=right | 3.2 km || 
|-id=778 bgcolor=#d6d6d6
| 226778 ||  || — || September 8, 2004 || Socorro || LINEAR || TEL || align=right | 2.0 km || 
|-id=779 bgcolor=#E9E9E9
| 226779 ||  || — || September 8, 2004 || Socorro || LINEAR || AGN || align=right | 2.2 km || 
|-id=780 bgcolor=#E9E9E9
| 226780 ||  || — || September 8, 2004 || Kvistaberg || UDAS || — || align=right | 3.4 km || 
|-id=781 bgcolor=#E9E9E9
| 226781 ||  || — || September 9, 2004 || Socorro || LINEAR || NEM || align=right | 2.5 km || 
|-id=782 bgcolor=#E9E9E9
| 226782 ||  || — || September 9, 2004 || Socorro || LINEAR || — || align=right | 3.2 km || 
|-id=783 bgcolor=#E9E9E9
| 226783 ||  || — || September 10, 2004 || Socorro || LINEAR || — || align=right | 2.3 km || 
|-id=784 bgcolor=#E9E9E9
| 226784 ||  || — || September 10, 2004 || Socorro || LINEAR || — || align=right | 3.8 km || 
|-id=785 bgcolor=#d6d6d6
| 226785 ||  || — || September 10, 2004 || Socorro || LINEAR || — || align=right | 2.7 km || 
|-id=786 bgcolor=#E9E9E9
| 226786 ||  || — || September 10, 2004 || Socorro || LINEAR || — || align=right | 3.7 km || 
|-id=787 bgcolor=#E9E9E9
| 226787 ||  || — || September 7, 2004 || Kitt Peak || Spacewatch || — || align=right | 2.5 km || 
|-id=788 bgcolor=#E9E9E9
| 226788 ||  || — || September 8, 2004 || Palomar || NEAT || DOR || align=right | 4.2 km || 
|-id=789 bgcolor=#E9E9E9
| 226789 ||  || — || September 9, 2004 || Kitt Peak || Spacewatch || PAD || align=right | 3.7 km || 
|-id=790 bgcolor=#E9E9E9
| 226790 ||  || — || September 10, 2004 || Socorro || LINEAR || — || align=right | 3.8 km || 
|-id=791 bgcolor=#E9E9E9
| 226791 ||  || — || September 10, 2004 || Socorro || LINEAR || — || align=right | 3.7 km || 
|-id=792 bgcolor=#E9E9E9
| 226792 ||  || — || September 10, 2004 || Socorro || LINEAR || — || align=right | 3.2 km || 
|-id=793 bgcolor=#E9E9E9
| 226793 ||  || — || September 10, 2004 || Socorro || LINEAR || — || align=right | 3.7 km || 
|-id=794 bgcolor=#E9E9E9
| 226794 ||  || — || September 10, 2004 || Socorro || LINEAR || INO || align=right | 1.7 km || 
|-id=795 bgcolor=#E9E9E9
| 226795 ||  || — || September 10, 2004 || Socorro || LINEAR || — || align=right | 4.6 km || 
|-id=796 bgcolor=#E9E9E9
| 226796 ||  || — || September 10, 2004 || Socorro || LINEAR || — || align=right | 4.5 km || 
|-id=797 bgcolor=#E9E9E9
| 226797 ||  || — || September 10, 2004 || Socorro || LINEAR || GEF || align=right | 5.1 km || 
|-id=798 bgcolor=#E9E9E9
| 226798 ||  || — || September 10, 2004 || Kitt Peak || Spacewatch || — || align=right | 4.1 km || 
|-id=799 bgcolor=#E9E9E9
| 226799 ||  || — || September 10, 2004 || Kitt Peak || Spacewatch || AGN || align=right | 1.4 km || 
|-id=800 bgcolor=#E9E9E9
| 226800 ||  || — || September 11, 2004 || Socorro || LINEAR || — || align=right | 2.5 km || 
|}

226801–226900 

|-bgcolor=#E9E9E9
| 226801 ||  || — || September 8, 2004 || Socorro || LINEAR || GEF || align=right | 1.7 km || 
|-id=802 bgcolor=#E9E9E9
| 226802 ||  || — || September 11, 2004 || Socorro || LINEAR || — || align=right | 2.6 km || 
|-id=803 bgcolor=#E9E9E9
| 226803 ||  || — || September 11, 2004 || Socorro || LINEAR || JUN || align=right | 1.7 km || 
|-id=804 bgcolor=#E9E9E9
| 226804 ||  || — || September 11, 2004 || Socorro || LINEAR || — || align=right | 3.9 km || 
|-id=805 bgcolor=#E9E9E9
| 226805 ||  || — || September 11, 2004 || Socorro || LINEAR || GAL || align=right | 3.0 km || 
|-id=806 bgcolor=#E9E9E9
| 226806 ||  || — || September 11, 2004 || Socorro || LINEAR || — || align=right | 4.7 km || 
|-id=807 bgcolor=#E9E9E9
| 226807 ||  || — || September 11, 2004 || Socorro || LINEAR || EUN || align=right | 2.0 km || 
|-id=808 bgcolor=#E9E9E9
| 226808 ||  || — || September 11, 2004 || Socorro || LINEAR || — || align=right | 2.4 km || 
|-id=809 bgcolor=#E9E9E9
| 226809 ||  || — || September 13, 2004 || Socorro || LINEAR || — || align=right | 2.4 km || 
|-id=810 bgcolor=#d6d6d6
| 226810 ||  || — || September 14, 2004 || Wrightwood || J. W. Young || EOS || align=right | 2.3 km || 
|-id=811 bgcolor=#E9E9E9
| 226811 ||  || — || September 9, 2004 || Socorro || LINEAR || — || align=right | 2.8 km || 
|-id=812 bgcolor=#d6d6d6
| 226812 ||  || — || September 9, 2004 || Socorro || LINEAR || — || align=right | 3.8 km || 
|-id=813 bgcolor=#E9E9E9
| 226813 ||  || — || September 9, 2004 || Kitt Peak || Spacewatch || HOF || align=right | 4.5 km || 
|-id=814 bgcolor=#d6d6d6
| 226814 ||  || — || September 9, 2004 || Kitt Peak || Spacewatch || KAR || align=right | 1.8 km || 
|-id=815 bgcolor=#d6d6d6
| 226815 ||  || — || September 9, 2004 || Kitt Peak || Spacewatch || KOR || align=right | 1.6 km || 
|-id=816 bgcolor=#E9E9E9
| 226816 ||  || — || September 10, 2004 || Socorro || LINEAR || TIN || align=right | 3.1 km || 
|-id=817 bgcolor=#E9E9E9
| 226817 ||  || — || September 10, 2004 || Kitt Peak || Spacewatch || HOF || align=right | 2.9 km || 
|-id=818 bgcolor=#E9E9E9
| 226818 ||  || — || September 10, 2004 || Kitt Peak || Spacewatch || WIT || align=right | 1.2 km || 
|-id=819 bgcolor=#E9E9E9
| 226819 ||  || — || September 6, 2004 || Palomar || NEAT || PAD || align=right | 4.2 km || 
|-id=820 bgcolor=#E9E9E9
| 226820 ||  || — || September 6, 2004 || Palomar || NEAT || — || align=right | 4.3 km || 
|-id=821 bgcolor=#E9E9E9
| 226821 ||  || — || September 10, 2004 || Kitt Peak || Spacewatch || HOF || align=right | 3.2 km || 
|-id=822 bgcolor=#E9E9E9
| 226822 ||  || — || September 15, 2004 || Kitt Peak || Spacewatch || HOF || align=right | 3.4 km || 
|-id=823 bgcolor=#E9E9E9
| 226823 ||  || — || September 15, 2004 || Socorro || LINEAR || WIT || align=right | 1.3 km || 
|-id=824 bgcolor=#d6d6d6
| 226824 ||  || — || September 15, 2004 || 7300 Observatory || W. K. Y. Yeung || — || align=right | 4.3 km || 
|-id=825 bgcolor=#d6d6d6
| 226825 ||  || — || September 11, 2004 || Kitt Peak || Spacewatch || — || align=right | 3.0 km || 
|-id=826 bgcolor=#E9E9E9
| 226826 ||  || — || September 12, 2004 || Socorro || LINEAR || — || align=right | 4.2 km || 
|-id=827 bgcolor=#E9E9E9
| 226827 ||  || — || September 15, 2004 || Siding Spring || SSS || GEF || align=right | 1.8 km || 
|-id=828 bgcolor=#d6d6d6
| 226828 ||  || — || September 13, 2004 || Socorro || LINEAR || HYGslow || align=right | 5.3 km || 
|-id=829 bgcolor=#E9E9E9
| 226829 ||  || — || September 13, 2004 || Socorro || LINEAR || — || align=right | 4.8 km || 
|-id=830 bgcolor=#E9E9E9
| 226830 ||  || — || September 13, 2004 || Kitt Peak || Spacewatch || — || align=right | 3.0 km || 
|-id=831 bgcolor=#E9E9E9
| 226831 ||  || — || September 13, 2004 || Socorro || LINEAR || GEF || align=right | 2.2 km || 
|-id=832 bgcolor=#E9E9E9
| 226832 ||  || — || September 15, 2004 || Anderson Mesa || LONEOS || — || align=right | 2.1 km || 
|-id=833 bgcolor=#E9E9E9
| 226833 ||  || — || September 15, 2004 || Anderson Mesa || LONEOS || — || align=right | 4.3 km || 
|-id=834 bgcolor=#E9E9E9
| 226834 ||  || — || September 15, 2004 || Kitt Peak || Spacewatch || — || align=right | 2.2 km || 
|-id=835 bgcolor=#E9E9E9
| 226835 ||  || — || September 15, 2004 || Kitt Peak || Spacewatch || — || align=right | 3.3 km || 
|-id=836 bgcolor=#E9E9E9
| 226836 ||  || — || September 17, 2004 || Socorro || LINEAR || HOF || align=right | 4.1 km || 
|-id=837 bgcolor=#E9E9E9
| 226837 ||  || — || September 17, 2004 || Anderson Mesa || LONEOS || DOR || align=right | 4.0 km || 
|-id=838 bgcolor=#E9E9E9
| 226838 ||  || — || September 18, 2004 || Socorro || LINEAR || GEF || align=right | 1.9 km || 
|-id=839 bgcolor=#E9E9E9
| 226839 ||  || — || September 17, 2004 || Kitt Peak || Spacewatch || WIT || align=right | 1.1 km || 
|-id=840 bgcolor=#d6d6d6
| 226840 ||  || — || September 17, 2004 || Kitt Peak || Spacewatch || KOR || align=right | 1.6 km || 
|-id=841 bgcolor=#d6d6d6
| 226841 ||  || — || September 17, 2004 || Kitt Peak || Spacewatch || — || align=right | 2.8 km || 
|-id=842 bgcolor=#E9E9E9
| 226842 ||  || — || September 22, 2004 || Desert Eagle || W. K. Y. Yeung || HNA || align=right | 4.4 km || 
|-id=843 bgcolor=#d6d6d6
| 226843 ||  || — || September 17, 2004 || Socorro || LINEAR || — || align=right | 3.1 km || 
|-id=844 bgcolor=#E9E9E9
| 226844 ||  || — || September 17, 2004 || Socorro || LINEAR || — || align=right | 3.4 km || 
|-id=845 bgcolor=#E9E9E9
| 226845 ||  || — || September 17, 2004 || Socorro || LINEAR || PAD || align=right | 4.1 km || 
|-id=846 bgcolor=#E9E9E9
| 226846 ||  || — || September 18, 2004 || Socorro || LINEAR || — || align=right | 2.8 km || 
|-id=847 bgcolor=#E9E9E9
| 226847 ||  || — || September 18, 2004 || Socorro || LINEAR || — || align=right | 3.9 km || 
|-id=848 bgcolor=#d6d6d6
| 226848 ||  || — || September 18, 2004 || Socorro || LINEAR || — || align=right | 2.6 km || 
|-id=849 bgcolor=#E9E9E9
| 226849 ||  || — || September 18, 2004 || Socorro || LINEAR || HOF || align=right | 4.3 km || 
|-id=850 bgcolor=#d6d6d6
| 226850 ||  || — || September 18, 2004 || Socorro || LINEAR || CHA || align=right | 2.5 km || 
|-id=851 bgcolor=#E9E9E9
| 226851 ||  || — || September 22, 2004 || Socorro || LINEAR || AGN || align=right | 2.0 km || 
|-id=852 bgcolor=#E9E9E9
| 226852 ||  || — || September 16, 2004 || Anderson Mesa || LONEOS || — || align=right | 2.9 km || 
|-id=853 bgcolor=#d6d6d6
| 226853 ||  || — || October 4, 2004 || Kitt Peak || Spacewatch || — || align=right | 2.9 km || 
|-id=854 bgcolor=#d6d6d6
| 226854 ||  || — || October 4, 2004 || Kitt Peak || Spacewatch || — || align=right | 3.6 km || 
|-id=855 bgcolor=#E9E9E9
| 226855 ||  || — || October 7, 2004 || Kitt Peak || Spacewatch || MRX || align=right | 1.3 km || 
|-id=856 bgcolor=#E9E9E9
| 226856 ||  || — || October 5, 2004 || Goodricke-Pigott || R. A. Tucker || NEM || align=right | 3.8 km || 
|-id=857 bgcolor=#E9E9E9
| 226857 ||  || — || October 6, 2004 || Sonoita || W. R. Cooney Jr., J. Gross || — || align=right | 3.1 km || 
|-id=858 bgcolor=#d6d6d6
| 226858 Ivanpuluj ||  ||  || October 8, 2004 || Andrushivka || Andrushivka Obs. || — || align=right | 4.8 km || 
|-id=859 bgcolor=#E9E9E9
| 226859 ||  || — || October 10, 2004 || Goodricke-Pigott || R. A. Tucker || — || align=right | 3.3 km || 
|-id=860 bgcolor=#d6d6d6
| 226860 ||  || — || October 8, 2004 || Goodricke-Pigott || Spacewatch || — || align=right | 3.6 km || 
|-id=861 bgcolor=#E9E9E9
| 226861 Elimaor ||  ||  || October 14, 2004 || Jarnac || Jarnac Obs. || — || align=right | 3.6 km || 
|-id=862 bgcolor=#E9E9E9
| 226862 ||  || — || October 4, 2004 || Kitt Peak || Spacewatch || — || align=right | 3.1 km || 
|-id=863 bgcolor=#d6d6d6
| 226863 ||  || — || October 4, 2004 || Kitt Peak || Spacewatch || — || align=right | 3.9 km || 
|-id=864 bgcolor=#E9E9E9
| 226864 ||  || — || October 4, 2004 || Kitt Peak || Spacewatch || WIT || align=right | 1.6 km || 
|-id=865 bgcolor=#E9E9E9
| 226865 ||  || — || October 4, 2004 || Kitt Peak || Spacewatch || HEN || align=right | 1.4 km || 
|-id=866 bgcolor=#E9E9E9
| 226866 ||  || — || October 4, 2004 || Anderson Mesa || LONEOS || — || align=right | 3.4 km || 
|-id=867 bgcolor=#E9E9E9
| 226867 ||  || — || October 4, 2004 || Kitt Peak || Spacewatch || AGN || align=right | 1.6 km || 
|-id=868 bgcolor=#d6d6d6
| 226868 ||  || — || October 4, 2004 || Kitt Peak || Spacewatch || KOR || align=right | 1.9 km || 
|-id=869 bgcolor=#E9E9E9
| 226869 ||  || — || October 5, 2004 || Kitt Peak || Spacewatch || HOF || align=right | 2.7 km || 
|-id=870 bgcolor=#d6d6d6
| 226870 ||  || — || October 5, 2004 || Anderson Mesa || LONEOS || KOR || align=right | 1.9 km || 
|-id=871 bgcolor=#d6d6d6
| 226871 ||  || — || October 6, 2004 || Kitt Peak || Spacewatch || — || align=right | 2.8 km || 
|-id=872 bgcolor=#d6d6d6
| 226872 ||  || — || October 6, 2004 || Palomar || NEAT || — || align=right | 4.4 km || 
|-id=873 bgcolor=#E9E9E9
| 226873 ||  || — || October 4, 2004 || Kitt Peak || Spacewatch || WIT || align=right | 1.5 km || 
|-id=874 bgcolor=#E9E9E9
| 226874 ||  || — || October 5, 2004 || Kitt Peak || Spacewatch || — || align=right | 2.2 km || 
|-id=875 bgcolor=#E9E9E9
| 226875 ||  || — || October 5, 2004 || Kitt Peak || Spacewatch || PAD || align=right | 3.6 km || 
|-id=876 bgcolor=#d6d6d6
| 226876 ||  || — || October 5, 2004 || Kitt Peak || Spacewatch || — || align=right | 2.5 km || 
|-id=877 bgcolor=#d6d6d6
| 226877 ||  || — || October 5, 2004 || Kitt Peak || Spacewatch || KAR || align=right | 1.6 km || 
|-id=878 bgcolor=#E9E9E9
| 226878 ||  || — || October 5, 2004 || Kitt Peak || Spacewatch || — || align=right | 2.9 km || 
|-id=879 bgcolor=#E9E9E9
| 226879 ||  || — || October 5, 2004 || Kitt Peak || Spacewatch || — || align=right | 1.8 km || 
|-id=880 bgcolor=#E9E9E9
| 226880 ||  || — || October 7, 2004 || Socorro || LINEAR || AGN || align=right | 1.8 km || 
|-id=881 bgcolor=#d6d6d6
| 226881 ||  || — || October 7, 2004 || Anderson Mesa || LONEOS || — || align=right | 4.0 km || 
|-id=882 bgcolor=#E9E9E9
| 226882 ||  || — || October 7, 2004 || Anderson Mesa || LONEOS || — || align=right | 2.8 km || 
|-id=883 bgcolor=#E9E9E9
| 226883 ||  || — || October 7, 2004 || Socorro || LINEAR || AGN || align=right | 1.8 km || 
|-id=884 bgcolor=#E9E9E9
| 226884 ||  || — || October 7, 2004 || Socorro || LINEAR || — || align=right | 4.1 km || 
|-id=885 bgcolor=#E9E9E9
| 226885 ||  || — || October 7, 2004 || Socorro || LINEAR || AGN || align=right | 1.7 km || 
|-id=886 bgcolor=#E9E9E9
| 226886 ||  || — || October 7, 2004 || Socorro || LINEAR || — || align=right | 4.8 km || 
|-id=887 bgcolor=#d6d6d6
| 226887 ||  || — || October 7, 2004 || Anderson Mesa || LONEOS || — || align=right | 5.2 km || 
|-id=888 bgcolor=#d6d6d6
| 226888 ||  || — || October 7, 2004 || Palomar || NEAT || KOR || align=right | 2.3 km || 
|-id=889 bgcolor=#E9E9E9
| 226889 ||  || — || October 8, 2004 || Anderson Mesa || LONEOS || — || align=right | 3.0 km || 
|-id=890 bgcolor=#d6d6d6
| 226890 ||  || — || October 8, 2004 || Anderson Mesa || LONEOS || — || align=right | 3.5 km || 
|-id=891 bgcolor=#E9E9E9
| 226891 ||  || — || October 9, 2004 || Anderson Mesa || LONEOS || NEM || align=right | 3.3 km || 
|-id=892 bgcolor=#d6d6d6
| 226892 ||  || — || October 4, 2004 || Kitt Peak || Spacewatch || — || align=right | 3.3 km || 
|-id=893 bgcolor=#d6d6d6
| 226893 ||  || — || October 4, 2004 || Kitt Peak || Spacewatch || EOS || align=right | 2.8 km || 
|-id=894 bgcolor=#d6d6d6
| 226894 ||  || — || October 4, 2004 || Kitt Peak || Spacewatch || — || align=right | 2.5 km || 
|-id=895 bgcolor=#d6d6d6
| 226895 ||  || — || October 4, 2004 || Kitt Peak || Spacewatch || — || align=right | 3.2 km || 
|-id=896 bgcolor=#E9E9E9
| 226896 ||  || — || October 6, 2004 || Kitt Peak || Spacewatch || — || align=right | 3.4 km || 
|-id=897 bgcolor=#d6d6d6
| 226897 ||  || — || October 6, 2004 || Kitt Peak || Spacewatch || KOR || align=right | 1.5 km || 
|-id=898 bgcolor=#E9E9E9
| 226898 ||  || — || October 6, 2004 || Kitt Peak || Spacewatch || — || align=right | 2.4 km || 
|-id=899 bgcolor=#E9E9E9
| 226899 ||  || — || October 6, 2004 || Kitt Peak || Spacewatch || PAD || align=right | 2.9 km || 
|-id=900 bgcolor=#E9E9E9
| 226900 ||  || — || October 6, 2004 || Kitt Peak || Spacewatch || — || align=right | 2.5 km || 
|}

226901–227000 

|-bgcolor=#E9E9E9
| 226901 ||  || — || October 7, 2004 || Kitt Peak || Spacewatch || — || align=right | 3.1 km || 
|-id=902 bgcolor=#d6d6d6
| 226902 ||  || — || October 7, 2004 || Socorro || LINEAR || KOR || align=right | 2.2 km || 
|-id=903 bgcolor=#E9E9E9
| 226903 ||  || — || October 7, 2004 || Socorro || LINEAR || WIT || align=right | 1.7 km || 
|-id=904 bgcolor=#d6d6d6
| 226904 ||  || — || October 8, 2004 || Socorro || LINEAR || BRA || align=right | 3.5 km || 
|-id=905 bgcolor=#E9E9E9
| 226905 ||  || — || October 7, 2004 || Kitt Peak || Spacewatch || — || align=right | 4.1 km || 
|-id=906 bgcolor=#E9E9E9
| 226906 ||  || — || October 7, 2004 || Kitt Peak || Spacewatch || — || align=right | 2.2 km || 
|-id=907 bgcolor=#E9E9E9
| 226907 ||  || — || October 7, 2004 || Kitt Peak || Spacewatch || — || align=right | 2.3 km || 
|-id=908 bgcolor=#E9E9E9
| 226908 ||  || — || October 7, 2004 || Kitt Peak || Spacewatch || — || align=right | 2.6 km || 
|-id=909 bgcolor=#E9E9E9
| 226909 ||  || — || October 7, 2004 || Kitt Peak || Spacewatch || — || align=right | 2.7 km || 
|-id=910 bgcolor=#E9E9E9
| 226910 ||  || — || October 7, 2004 || Kitt Peak || Spacewatch || — || align=right | 2.6 km || 
|-id=911 bgcolor=#E9E9E9
| 226911 ||  || — || October 7, 2004 || Kitt Peak || Spacewatch || AST || align=right | 3.2 km || 
|-id=912 bgcolor=#d6d6d6
| 226912 ||  || — || October 7, 2004 || Kitt Peak || Spacewatch || KOR || align=right | 1.5 km || 
|-id=913 bgcolor=#d6d6d6
| 226913 ||  || — || October 7, 2004 || Kitt Peak || Spacewatch || — || align=right | 4.1 km || 
|-id=914 bgcolor=#E9E9E9
| 226914 ||  || — || October 7, 2004 || Kitt Peak || Spacewatch || AGN || align=right | 1.9 km || 
|-id=915 bgcolor=#d6d6d6
| 226915 ||  || — || October 7, 2004 || Kitt Peak || Spacewatch || — || align=right | 2.6 km || 
|-id=916 bgcolor=#d6d6d6
| 226916 ||  || — || October 7, 2004 || Kitt Peak || Spacewatch || KAR || align=right | 1.7 km || 
|-id=917 bgcolor=#E9E9E9
| 226917 ||  || — || October 7, 2004 || Kitt Peak || Spacewatch || AEO || align=right | 2.4 km || 
|-id=918 bgcolor=#E9E9E9
| 226918 ||  || — || October 8, 2004 || Kitt Peak || Spacewatch || — || align=right | 3.3 km || 
|-id=919 bgcolor=#d6d6d6
| 226919 ||  || — || October 8, 2004 || Kitt Peak || Spacewatch || CHA || align=right | 2.2 km || 
|-id=920 bgcolor=#E9E9E9
| 226920 ||  || — || October 7, 2004 || Socorro || LINEAR || DOR || align=right | 5.6 km || 
|-id=921 bgcolor=#d6d6d6
| 226921 ||  || — || October 8, 2004 || Kitt Peak || Spacewatch || KOR || align=right | 1.6 km || 
|-id=922 bgcolor=#d6d6d6
| 226922 ||  || — || October 9, 2004 || Kitt Peak || Spacewatch || KOR || align=right | 1.6 km || 
|-id=923 bgcolor=#E9E9E9
| 226923 ||  || — || October 10, 2004 || Socorro || LINEAR || — || align=right | 4.4 km || 
|-id=924 bgcolor=#E9E9E9
| 226924 ||  || — || October 7, 2004 || Kitt Peak || Spacewatch || — || align=right | 3.1 km || 
|-id=925 bgcolor=#E9E9E9
| 226925 ||  || — || October 9, 2004 || Kitt Peak || Spacewatch || — || align=right | 2.7 km || 
|-id=926 bgcolor=#E9E9E9
| 226926 ||  || — || October 9, 2004 || Kitt Peak || Spacewatch || — || align=right | 2.8 km || 
|-id=927 bgcolor=#E9E9E9
| 226927 ||  || — || October 9, 2004 || Kitt Peak || Spacewatch || — || align=right | 2.5 km || 
|-id=928 bgcolor=#d6d6d6
| 226928 ||  || — || October 9, 2004 || Kitt Peak || Spacewatch || CHA || align=right | 3.0 km || 
|-id=929 bgcolor=#E9E9E9
| 226929 ||  || — || October 10, 2004 || Socorro || LINEAR || — || align=right | 3.2 km || 
|-id=930 bgcolor=#E9E9E9
| 226930 ||  || — || October 10, 2004 || Socorro || LINEAR || WIT || align=right | 1.4 km || 
|-id=931 bgcolor=#E9E9E9
| 226931 ||  || — || October 10, 2004 || Kitt Peak || Spacewatch || — || align=right | 3.3 km || 
|-id=932 bgcolor=#E9E9E9
| 226932 ||  || — || October 7, 2004 || Anderson Mesa || LONEOS || AGN || align=right | 2.1 km || 
|-id=933 bgcolor=#E9E9E9
| 226933 ||  || — || October 9, 2004 || Socorro || LINEAR || MRX || align=right | 1.8 km || 
|-id=934 bgcolor=#E9E9E9
| 226934 ||  || — || October 10, 2004 || Kitt Peak || Spacewatch || AGN || align=right | 1.3 km || 
|-id=935 bgcolor=#d6d6d6
| 226935 ||  || — || October 10, 2004 || Kitt Peak || Spacewatch || KOR || align=right | 1.5 km || 
|-id=936 bgcolor=#E9E9E9
| 226936 ||  || — || October 8, 2004 || Anderson Mesa || LONEOS || — || align=right | 3.3 km || 
|-id=937 bgcolor=#d6d6d6
| 226937 ||  || — || October 8, 2004 || Socorro || LINEAR || — || align=right | 2.7 km || 
|-id=938 bgcolor=#E9E9E9
| 226938 ||  || — || October 10, 2004 || Kitt Peak || Spacewatch || WIT || align=right | 1.4 km || 
|-id=939 bgcolor=#d6d6d6
| 226939 ||  || — || October 10, 2004 || Socorro || LINEAR || — || align=right | 3.1 km || 
|-id=940 bgcolor=#d6d6d6
| 226940 ||  || — || October 11, 2004 || Kitt Peak || Spacewatch || — || align=right | 4.3 km || 
|-id=941 bgcolor=#E9E9E9
| 226941 ||  || — || October 9, 2004 || Kitt Peak || Spacewatch || — || align=right | 1.8 km || 
|-id=942 bgcolor=#d6d6d6
| 226942 ||  || — || October 9, 2004 || Kitt Peak || Spacewatch || — || align=right | 4.6 km || 
|-id=943 bgcolor=#d6d6d6
| 226943 ||  || — || October 10, 2004 || Kitt Peak || Spacewatch || — || align=right | 3.0 km || 
|-id=944 bgcolor=#E9E9E9
| 226944 ||  || — || October 15, 2004 || Kitt Peak || Spacewatch || — || align=right | 4.3 km || 
|-id=945 bgcolor=#d6d6d6
| 226945 ||  || — || October 7, 2004 || Socorro || LINEAR || — || align=right | 3.9 km || 
|-id=946 bgcolor=#E9E9E9
| 226946 ||  || — || October 7, 2004 || Socorro || LINEAR || — || align=right | 3.8 km || 
|-id=947 bgcolor=#E9E9E9
| 226947 ||  || — || October 5, 2004 || Anderson Mesa || LONEOS || — || align=right | 2.8 km || 
|-id=948 bgcolor=#E9E9E9
| 226948 ||  || — || October 10, 2004 || Socorro || LINEAR || — || align=right | 3.1 km || 
|-id=949 bgcolor=#d6d6d6
| 226949 ||  || — || October 7, 2004 || Kitt Peak || Spacewatch || CHA || align=right | 2.1 km || 
|-id=950 bgcolor=#E9E9E9
| 226950 ||  || — || October 16, 2004 || Socorro || LINEAR || MAR || align=right | 2.1 km || 
|-id=951 bgcolor=#d6d6d6
| 226951 ||  || — || November 3, 2004 || Palomar || NEAT || — || align=right | 3.7 km || 
|-id=952 bgcolor=#d6d6d6
| 226952 ||  || — || November 4, 2004 || Catalina || CSS || — || align=right | 3.7 km || 
|-id=953 bgcolor=#d6d6d6
| 226953 ||  || — || November 4, 2004 || Kitt Peak || Spacewatch || — || align=right | 3.7 km || 
|-id=954 bgcolor=#d6d6d6
| 226954 ||  || — || November 4, 2004 || Kitt Peak || Spacewatch || — || align=right | 3.2 km || 
|-id=955 bgcolor=#d6d6d6
| 226955 ||  || — || November 4, 2004 || Kitt Peak || Spacewatch || — || align=right | 3.2 km || 
|-id=956 bgcolor=#d6d6d6
| 226956 ||  || — || November 4, 2004 || Kitt Peak || Spacewatch || EMA || align=right | 4.2 km || 
|-id=957 bgcolor=#d6d6d6
| 226957 ||  || — || November 4, 2004 || Catalina || CSS || EOS || align=right | 3.2 km || 
|-id=958 bgcolor=#d6d6d6
| 226958 ||  || — || November 4, 2004 || Socorro || LINEAR || — || align=right | 4.6 km || 
|-id=959 bgcolor=#d6d6d6
| 226959 ||  || — || November 10, 2004 || Kitt Peak || Spacewatch || — || align=right | 5.4 km || 
|-id=960 bgcolor=#d6d6d6
| 226960 ||  || — || November 11, 2004 || Jornada || D. S. Dixon || — || align=right | 2.9 km || 
|-id=961 bgcolor=#d6d6d6
| 226961 ||  || — || November 9, 2004 || Catalina || CSS || — || align=right | 4.0 km || 
|-id=962 bgcolor=#E9E9E9
| 226962 ||  || — || November 12, 2004 || Catalina || CSS || MRX || align=right | 1.6 km || 
|-id=963 bgcolor=#d6d6d6
| 226963 ||  || — || November 4, 2004 || Kitt Peak || Spacewatch || — || align=right | 3.8 km || 
|-id=964 bgcolor=#d6d6d6
| 226964 ||  || — || November 10, 2004 || Kitt Peak || Spacewatch || — || align=right | 3.2 km || 
|-id=965 bgcolor=#d6d6d6
| 226965 ||  || — || November 11, 2004 || Kitt Peak || Spacewatch || — || align=right | 3.3 km || 
|-id=966 bgcolor=#d6d6d6
| 226966 ||  || — || November 10, 2004 || Kitt Peak || Spacewatch || — || align=right | 3.1 km || 
|-id=967 bgcolor=#d6d6d6
| 226967 ||  || — || November 11, 2004 || Kitt Peak || Spacewatch || — || align=right | 3.3 km || 
|-id=968 bgcolor=#E9E9E9
| 226968 ||  || — || November 9, 2004 || Mauna Kea || C. Veillet || HOF || align=right | 3.8 km || 
|-id=969 bgcolor=#d6d6d6
| 226969 ||  || — || November 9, 2004 || Mauna Kea || C. Veillet || — || align=right | 2.3 km || 
|-id=970 bgcolor=#d6d6d6
| 226970 ||  || — || November 3, 2004 || Catalina || CSS || NAE || align=right | 4.8 km || 
|-id=971 bgcolor=#d6d6d6
| 226971 ||  || — || November 11, 2004 || Kitt Peak || Spacewatch || EOS || align=right | 3.1 km || 
|-id=972 bgcolor=#d6d6d6
| 226972 ||  || — || November 17, 2004 || Campo Imperatore || CINEOS || THM || align=right | 3.5 km || 
|-id=973 bgcolor=#d6d6d6
| 226973 ||  || — || November 19, 2004 || Socorro || LINEAR || 615 || align=right | 2.2 km || 
|-id=974 bgcolor=#d6d6d6
| 226974 ||  || — || December 9, 2004 || Catalina || CSS || — || align=right | 6.5 km || 
|-id=975 bgcolor=#fefefe
| 226975 ||  || — || December 10, 2004 || Socorro || LINEAR || H || align=right | 1.0 km || 
|-id=976 bgcolor=#d6d6d6
| 226976 ||  || — || December 3, 2004 || Kitt Peak || Spacewatch || — || align=right | 3.9 km || 
|-id=977 bgcolor=#d6d6d6
| 226977 ||  || — || December 8, 2004 || Socorro || LINEAR || — || align=right | 6.2 km || 
|-id=978 bgcolor=#d6d6d6
| 226978 ||  || — || December 8, 2004 || Socorro || LINEAR || — || align=right | 3.0 km || 
|-id=979 bgcolor=#d6d6d6
| 226979 ||  || — || December 8, 2004 || Socorro || LINEAR || HYG || align=right | 3.1 km || 
|-id=980 bgcolor=#d6d6d6
| 226980 ||  || — || December 8, 2004 || Socorro || LINEAR || — || align=right | 3.5 km || 
|-id=981 bgcolor=#d6d6d6
| 226981 ||  || — || December 10, 2004 || Socorro || LINEAR || — || align=right | 4.5 km || 
|-id=982 bgcolor=#d6d6d6
| 226982 ||  || — || December 10, 2004 || Socorro || LINEAR || — || align=right | 5.2 km || 
|-id=983 bgcolor=#d6d6d6
| 226983 ||  || — || December 8, 2004 || Socorro || LINEAR || — || align=right | 3.7 km || 
|-id=984 bgcolor=#d6d6d6
| 226984 ||  || — || December 9, 2004 || Catalina || CSS || — || align=right | 4.0 km || 
|-id=985 bgcolor=#d6d6d6
| 226985 ||  || — || December 2, 2004 || Goodricke-Pigott || Goodricke-Pigott Obs. || — || align=right | 3.7 km || 
|-id=986 bgcolor=#E9E9E9
| 226986 ||  || — || December 10, 2004 || Socorro || LINEAR || — || align=right | 4.3 km || 
|-id=987 bgcolor=#d6d6d6
| 226987 ||  || — || December 11, 2004 || Campo Imperatore || CINEOS || KOR || align=right | 2.2 km || 
|-id=988 bgcolor=#d6d6d6
| 226988 ||  || — || December 10, 2004 || Kitt Peak || Spacewatch || HYG || align=right | 4.7 km || 
|-id=989 bgcolor=#d6d6d6
| 226989 ||  || — || December 10, 2004 || Socorro || LINEAR || — || align=right | 4.2 km || 
|-id=990 bgcolor=#d6d6d6
| 226990 ||  || — || December 10, 2004 || Kitt Peak || Spacewatch || ALA || align=right | 6.1 km || 
|-id=991 bgcolor=#fefefe
| 226991 ||  || — || December 14, 2004 || Socorro || LINEAR || H || align=right data-sort-value="0.98" | 980 m || 
|-id=992 bgcolor=#d6d6d6
| 226992 ||  || — || December 2, 2004 || Kitt Peak || Spacewatch || EOS || align=right | 3.3 km || 
|-id=993 bgcolor=#d6d6d6
| 226993 ||  || — || December 11, 2004 || Socorro || LINEAR || — || align=right | 7.7 km || 
|-id=994 bgcolor=#d6d6d6
| 226994 ||  || — || December 11, 2004 || Kitt Peak || Spacewatch || — || align=right | 3.9 km || 
|-id=995 bgcolor=#d6d6d6
| 226995 ||  || — || December 8, 2004 || Socorro || LINEAR || — || align=right | 2.8 km || 
|-id=996 bgcolor=#d6d6d6
| 226996 ||  || — || December 9, 2004 || Bergisch Gladbach || W. Bickel || — || align=right | 5.6 km || 
|-id=997 bgcolor=#E9E9E9
| 226997 ||  || — || December 10, 2004 || Kitt Peak || Spacewatch || HOF || align=right | 4.9 km || 
|-id=998 bgcolor=#d6d6d6
| 226998 ||  || — || December 10, 2004 || Socorro || LINEAR || — || align=right | 4.3 km || 
|-id=999 bgcolor=#d6d6d6
| 226999 ||  || — || December 10, 2004 || Socorro || LINEAR || EOS || align=right | 3.8 km || 
|-id=000 bgcolor=#d6d6d6
| 227000 ||  || — || December 10, 2004 || Socorro || LINEAR || KOR || align=right | 2.2 km || 
|}

References

External links 
 Discovery Circumstances: Numbered Minor Planets (225001)–(230000) (IAU Minor Planet Center)

0226